= British Airtours =

Charter airline of the United Kingdom (1969–1988)

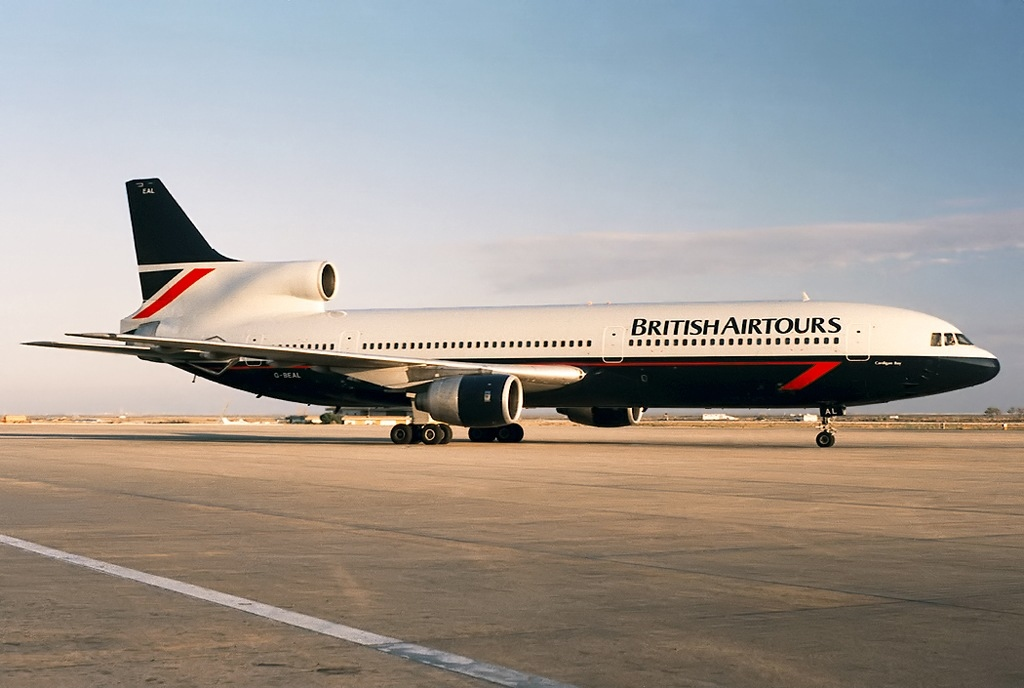
- Lockheed L-1011 Tristar
IATA	ICAO	Call sign
KT	BKT	BEATOURS
- Founded: 24 April 1969 (as BEA Airtours)
- Commenced operations: 5 March 1970
- Ceased operations: 31 March 1988 (merged operations into Caledonian Airways)
- Operating bases: London–Gatwick; Manchester
- Parent company: British European Airways (1969–1974); British Airways (1974–1988)
- Headquarters: Administrative HQ: Gatwick Airport (1970–1988); Corporate HQ: Ruislip (1969–1973); Corporate HQ: Heathrow Airport (1974–1988); Combined HQ: Lowfield Heath, Crawley (1988–1999)
- Key people: P.C.F. Lawton; Eamonn Mullaney; Capt. W. Baillie; George Blundell-Pound; E.L. Killip; J.R. Wood; Capt. P.J. McKeown; R.A. Thorburn; W.A. Thompson; J. Marshall

British Airtours (stylised as British aırtours) was a charter airline in the United Kingdom with flight operations out of London Gatwick and Manchester Airports.

Established as BEA Airtours in 1969, it became a wholly owned subsidiary of British Airways (BA) following the merger between British European Airways (BEA) and British Overseas Airways Corporation (BOAC) in the early 1970s. British Airtours adopted the Caledonian Airways name when the newly British Airways completed the acquisition of the rival British Caledonian in April 1988. Caledonian Airways was eventually sold to tour operator Inspirations in 1995, marking BA's exit from the mainstream inclusive tour market. In 1999, Thomas Cook acquired Inspirations and merged Caledonian Airways with Flying Colours to form JMC Air Services, a forerunner of the UK arm of the later Thomas Cook Airlines. On 23 September 2019, Thomas Cook Airlines ceased operations, thus ending the legacy of British Airtours.

== History ==
=== Origins ===
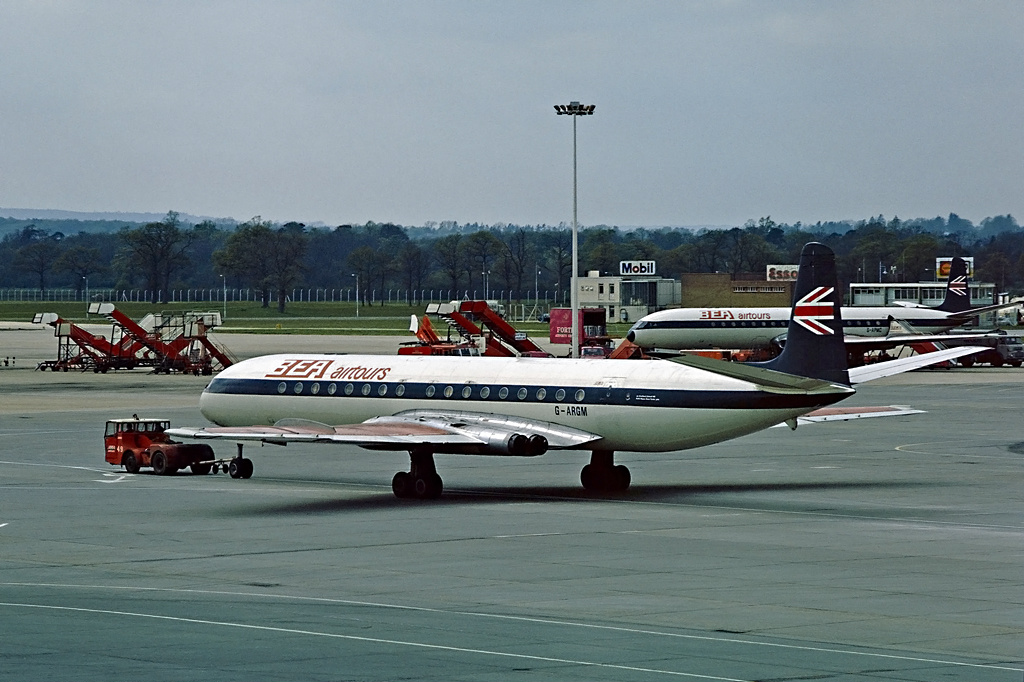
A BEA Airtours de Havilland Comet 4B wearing the original, late 60s/early 70s BEA "Speedjack"-derived livery, seen at Gatwick Airport in 1973.

BEA Airtours Ltd. was formed on 24 April 1969 as a subsidiary of British European Airways to provide it with a low cost platform to participate in the then rapidly growing inclusive tour (IT) holiday flights market, which until then had been the exclusive domain of wholly privately owned airlines independent from the government-owned corporation BEA and BOAC. BEA saw this as a necessary counterweight to the independents' rapidly growing scheduled activities that began encroaching on what BEA and BOAC had traditionally regarded as their sole preserve. BEA Airtours' formation was in line with one of the recommendations of the Edwards Report on the future of British air industry – that the corporations should enter the inclusive tour and charter market.

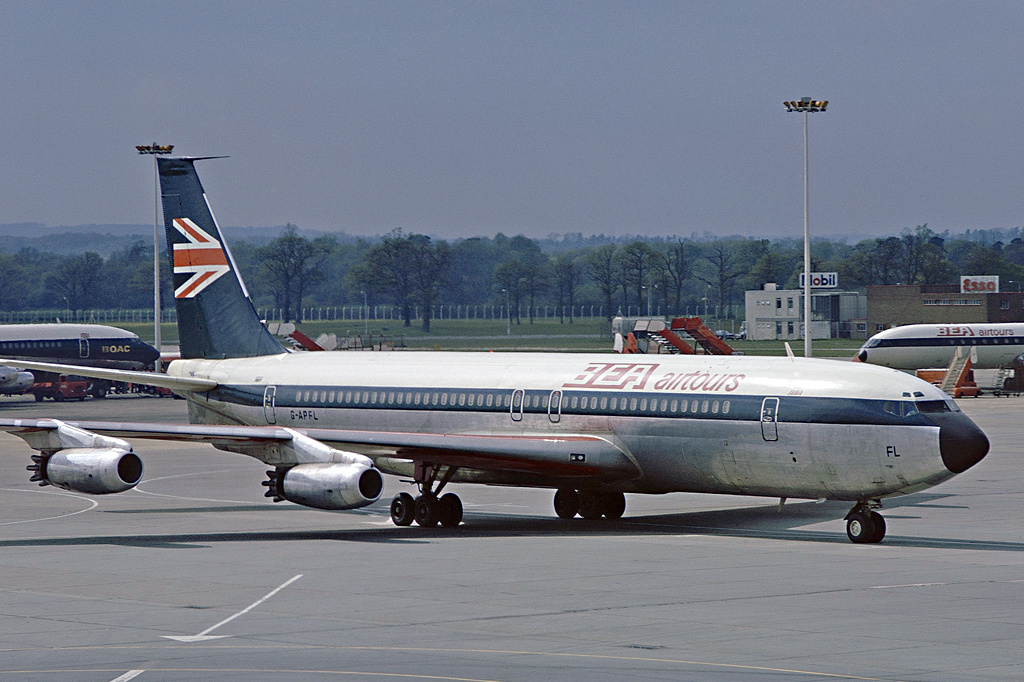
A BEA Airtours Boeing 707-436 wearing the original, late 60s/early 70s BEA "Speed-jack"-derived livery, seen at Gatwick Airport in 1973.

The independent charter airlines were suspicious of BEA's motive to enter the IT market and some feared that the operator held a hidden agenda to destabilise this market by undercutting the independent carriers, none of which could match the corporation's financial resources and access to capital at the time. The independents moreover thought that BEA Airtours was meant to take on the corporations' excess staff as well as to absorb aircraft that were surplus to their requirements. They feared that this would lead to significant market distortions, creating excess capacity and further depressing the already low charter rates in a highly competitive market.

BEA's charter subsidiary had a startup capital of £250,000 and selected Gatwick Airport south of London to serve as its base, where it took over the former Transglobe Airways hangar to provide engineering support for its Gatwick fleet. The airline commenced commercial operations out of Gatwick, initially using a fleet of seven second-hand ex-BEA de Havilland Comet series 4B aircraft which seated 109 passengers in a single-class configuration. On 5 March 1970, the first revenue flight departed Gatwick.

=== Corporate changes, new name and new services ===
During 1971, BEA Airtours had decided to replace the entire fleet with a similar number of larger capacity, longer range and more fuel-efficient ex-American Airlines Boeing 707-123Bs to enable it to commence non-stop, long-haul charter flights, including affinity group charters to North America. Despite having obtained permission from the Department of Trade and Industry to import second-hand 707-120Bs and the non-availability of internally sourced alternatives (BOAC's 707-436s) within the envisaged timeframe, both corporations opposed this decision. They insisted that any new aircraft should be exclusively sourced from the existing BEA and BOAC fleets.

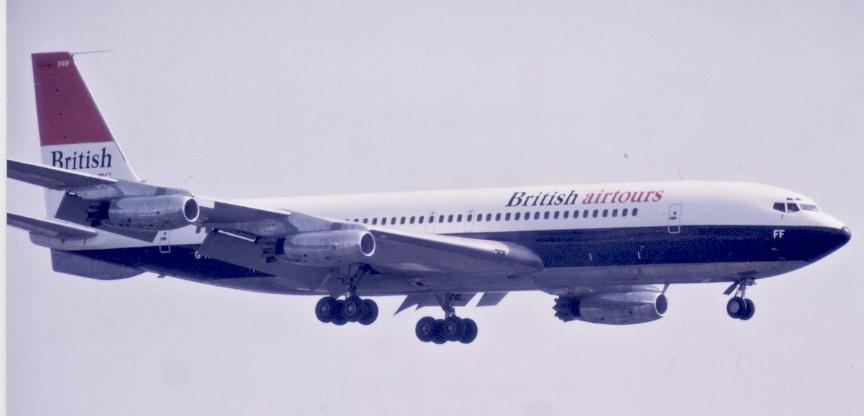
A British Airtours Boeing 707-436 wearing the red, white and blue 1970s and early 80s Negus & Negus livery, 1974.

Following the corporations' intervention, BEA Airtours acquired seven former BOAC Boeing 707-436s. These aircraft had a greater seating capacity than required and were powered by four Rolls-Royce Conway engines, an older generation engine type than the four Pratt & Whitney JT3D turbofans which powered the ex-American 707-123Bs it had originally selected to replace its Comet fleet. This meant that the ex-BOAC 707s had higher operating costs. However, BOAC was prepared to sell these aircraft to BEA Airtours at a lower price than American was asking for its planes. The £4.3m sale price included BOAC's entire spares holding (inclusive of engines) for the seven aircraft. This helped compensate for the cost differential. The first of these 174-seat aircraft entered service in 1971 while the last aircraft of this batch joined the fleet in 1973. By that time, four of the airline's nine Comet 4Bs had already been withdrawn from service and sold to rival British charter airlines.

The 1973 oil crisis in the wake of the 1973 Arab-Israeli War, which led to a quadrupling of the price of a barrel of oil, substantially increased the operating costs of the remaining fuel-thirsty Comets and began to have an adverse impact on the airline's financial performance. British Airtours, as the airline had become known following the establishment of British Airways in 1974 as a result of the 1972 BEA—BOAC merger, therefore decided to retire its remaining five Comets at the end of that year's summer season and to sell the entire fleet to independent British operator Dan-Air.

In 1975, British Airtours Ltd. - new name of the airline from 1 January 1974 - commenced transatlantic Advance Booking Charter (ABC) flights to the United States. Over the coming years, British Airtours acquired additional Boeing 707s which British Airways had inherited from BOAC. In June 1982, British Airtours launched twice-weekly scheduled services between Gatwick and Newark using Boeing 707s in an all-economy configuration. However, the airline's foray into the transatlantic scheduled market ended after only seven months in early January 1983.

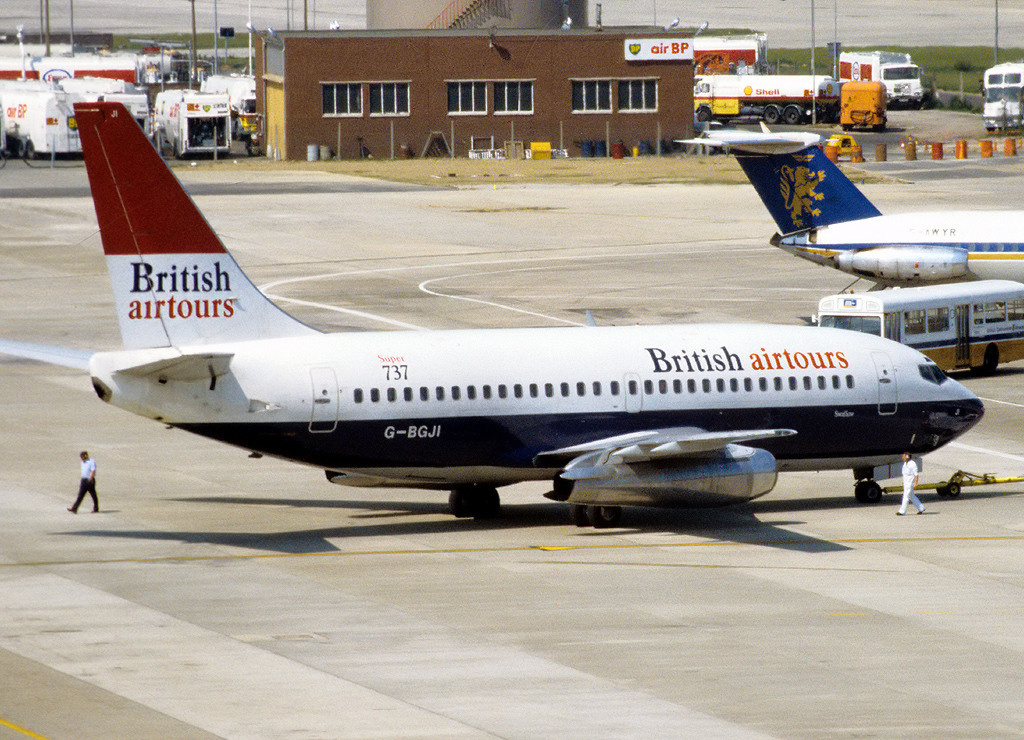
A British Airtours Boeing 737-236 Adv wearing the red, white and blue 1970s and early 80s Negus & Negus livery, seen at Gatwick Airport in 1982.

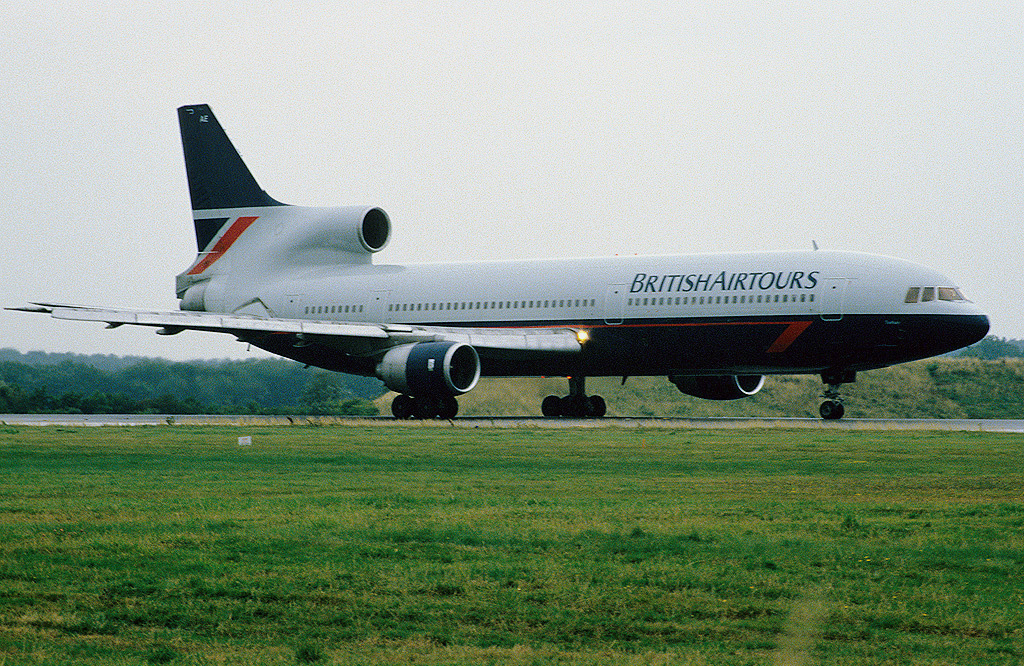
A British Airtours Lockheed L-1011 Tristar 1 wearing the predominantly midnight blue and pearl grey mid-1980s to late-90s Landor Associates livery, seen at Gatwick Airport in 1986.

When British Airways decided in the late-1970s to replace the ageing and increasingly inefficient short-/medium-haul Hawker Siddeley Tridents and BAC One-Elevens which it had inherited from BEA with Boeing 737s and 757s, a follow-on order for nine brand-new 737-236 Advanced aircraft was placed with Boeing. These aircraft, which were delivered to British Airtours' Gatwick base during the early 1980s, allowed it to replace all of its old, second-hand narrow-bodied planes with brand-new equipment, thereby considerably enhancing its competitiveness vis-à-vis its independent rivals.

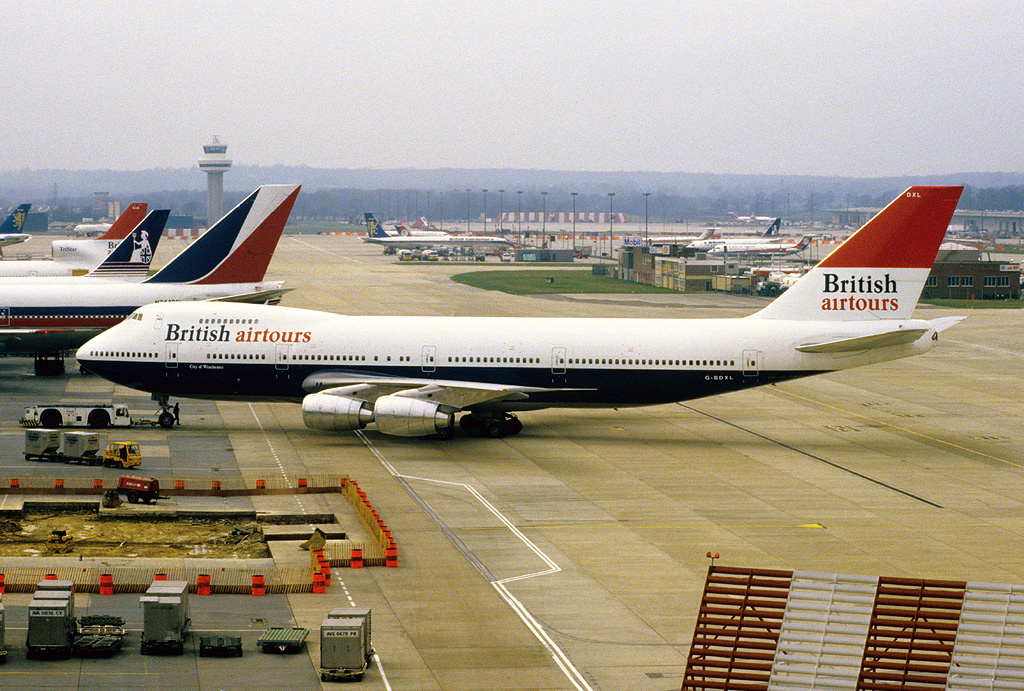
A British Airtours Boeing 747-236B wearing the red, white and blue 1970s and early 80s Negus & Negus livery, seen at Gatwick Airport in 1984.

During 1984, British Airtours took delivery of a Rolls-Royce RB211-powered Boeing 747-236Bs at Gatwick, its first and only brand-new widebodied aircraft. This aircraft was put into service on the airline's popular, long-haul ABC flights to North America. The same year, British Airtours' last Boeing 707 made its final revenue flight. In the meantime, British Airtours also began taking delivery of a small number of former British Airways Lockheed L-1011 Tristar widebodies, which initially supplemented its narrow-bodied 737 fleet on the busier and more popular routes. In 1985, British Airtours introduced a new livery that closely resembled the one used by British Airways at the time (designed by Landor Associates).

=== Another new name and late activity ===
In April 1988, British Airtours was fully merged into the popular Caledonian Airways brand. This brand new air carrier had been established by the newly privatised British Airways on 10 December 1987, to take over all the Group charter operations and after the takeover of its former Gatwick-based rival British Caledonian. As an additional measure to signify the change, the airline also adopted a modified Caledonian livery which had been adapted from the contemporary, Landor Associates-designed British Airways livery. The newly rebranded Caledonian Airways transferred its Gatwick operation from the airport's South Terminal into the then brand-new North Terminal, thereby concentrating the majority of the British Airways group's Gatwick services within the new terminal.

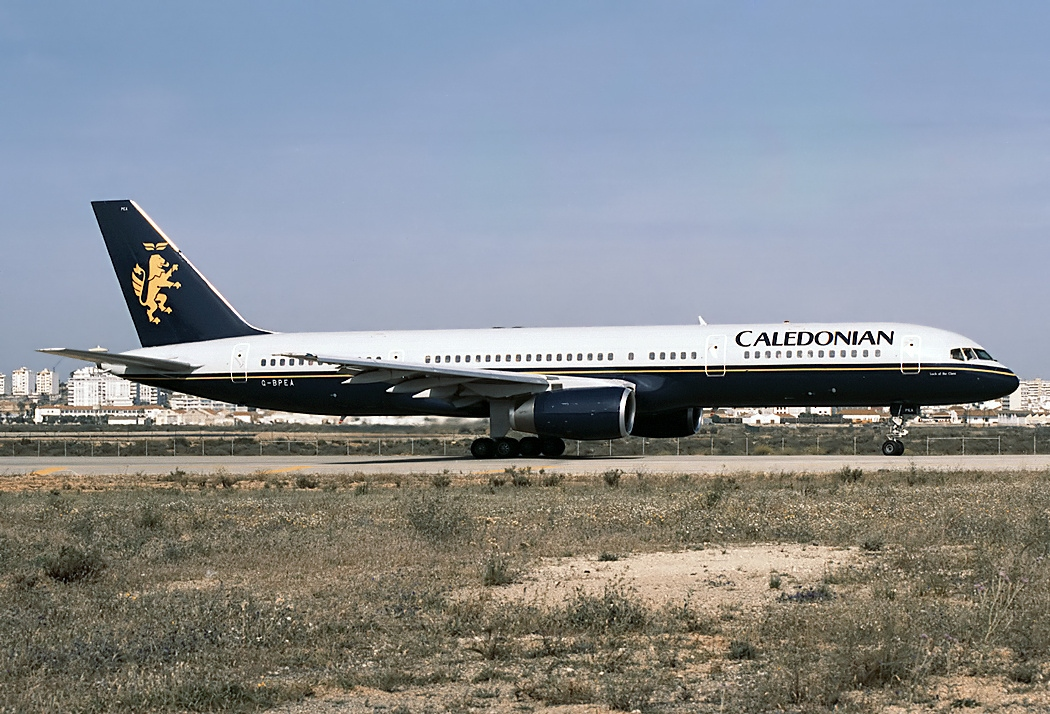
Boeing 757-236

Shortly thereafter, Caledonian Airways commenced the replacement of its Boeing 737 narrow-bodies with additional ex-British Airways L-1011 Tristar widebodies as well as with a number of brand-new Boeing 757s sourced from the large Boeing 757-236 orders placed by its parent company. The former British Airtours 737s were re-configured in British Airways' contemporary short-haul two-class cabin arrangement and began to replace the BAC One-Eleven 500s which British Airways had inherited from British Caledonian on the UK flag carrier's short-haul Gatwick routes.

During 1995, British Airways decided to exit the short- to medium-haul package holiday market; accordingly, the airline sold Caledonian Airways to British-based tour operator Inspirations, which was then a part of the American-owned Carlson Leisure group, along with the firm's core fleet of five Tristars. Following Caledonian's sale to Inspirations, the Boeing 757s were returned to British Airways. During 1999, Inspirations became part of the Thomas Cook group when Caledonian Airways was merged with the Flying Colours airline to form JMC Airlines on 27 March 2000, which in turn became the British arm of the present day Thomas Cook Airlines in 2003. Following Inspirations' takeover by Thomas Cook, the remaining former Caledonian Airways Tristars were withdrawn from service as these had suffered increasing and widely publicised reliability problems which had resulted in a generally poor perception of Caledonian amongst the travelling public.

== Aircraft operated ==
Throughout its 29-year existence the following aircraft types formed part of the BEA Airtours/British Airtours/Caledonian fleet:

- Airbus A320-200 (Caledonian)
- Boeing 707-336B/C (British Airtours)/436 (BEA Airtours/British Airtours)
- Boeing 737-236 Advanced (British Airtours/Caledonian)
- Boeing 747-236B (British Airtours)
- Boeing 757-236 (Caledonian)
- de Havilland Comet 4B (BEA Airtours)
- Lockheed L-1011 Tristar 1/50/100/200 (British Airtours/Caledonian)
- McDonnell-Douglas DC-10-30 (Caledonian).

=== Fleet details ===
==== Fleet in 1970 ====
In March 1970, the BEA Airtours fleet comprised 9 aircraft.

BEA Airtours fleet in March 1970
Aircraft	Total
de Havilland Comet 4B	9
Total	9

==== Fleet in 1972 ====
In May 1972, the BEA Airtours fleet comprised 11 aircraft.

BEA Airtours fleet in May 1972
Aircraft	Total
Boeing 707-436	2
de Havilland Comet 4B	9
Total	11

Five Boeing 707-436 were on order.

==== Fleet in 1974 ====
In March 1974, the British Airtours fleet comprised 9 aircraft.

British Airtours fleet in March 1974
Aircraft	Total
Boeing 707-436	9
Total	9

==== Fleet in 1982 ====
In April 1982, the British Airtours fleet comprised 9 aircraft.

British Airtours fleet in April 1982
Aircraft	Total
Boeing 737-236 Advanced	9
Total	9

==== Fleet in 1984 ====
In March 1984, the British Airtours fleet comprised 16 aircraft.

British Airtours fleet in March 1984
Aircraft	Total
Boeing 747-236B	1
Lockheed L-1011 Tristar 200/200F	2
Lockheed L-1011 Tristar 1	3
Boeing 707-336B	1
Boeing 737-200 Advanced	9
Total	16

==== Fleet in 1988 ====
In March 1988, the British Airtours fleet comprised 10 aircraft.

British Airtours fleet in March 1988
Aircraft	Total
Lockheed L-1011 Tristar 100	1
Lockheed L-1011 Tristar 1	3
Boeing 737-200 Advanced	6
Total	10

== Incidents and accidents ==
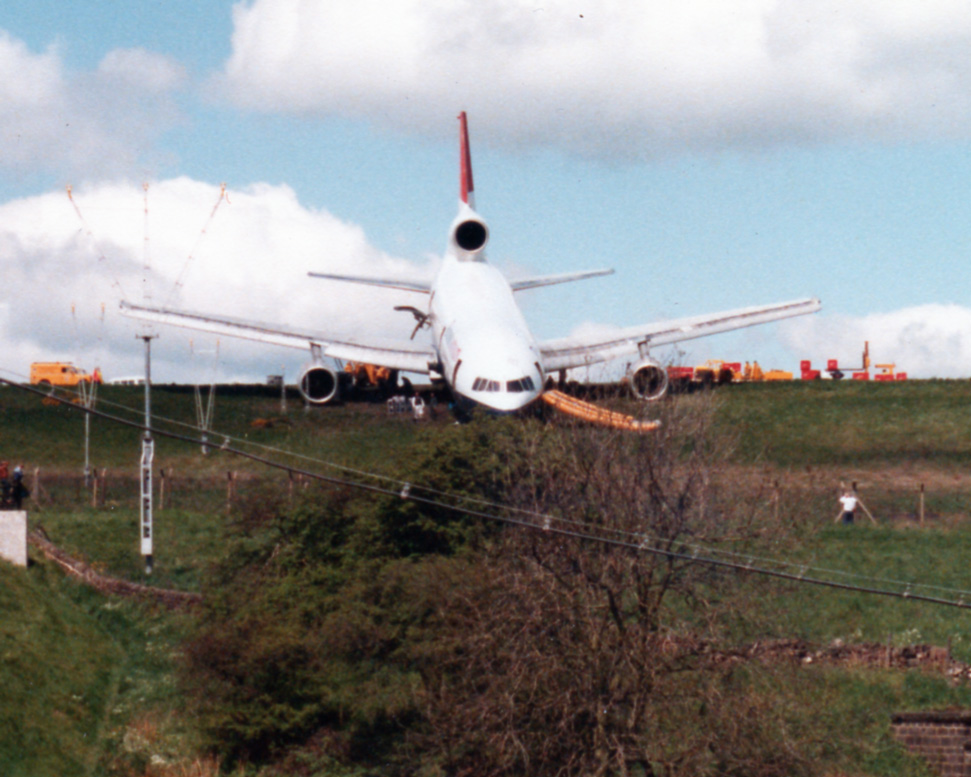
British Airtours Lockheed TriStar 1 overran the runway at Leeds Bradford Airport on 27 May 1985.

1. On 17 March 1977, a Boeing 707-436, crashed soon after takeoff, injuring the 4 crew on board. The flight was a training session for three trainees at Glasgow Prestwick Airport. The cause was a delay of the pilots doing the correct procedures for a failing engine.
2. On 27 May 1985, a Lockheed TriStar, G-BBAI, operating Flight 101, overran the runway at Leeds Bradford Airport on landing from Palma after a rain shower. The aircraft was evacuated, with only minor injuries sustained by the 14 crew and 398 passengers. The nose landing gear strut folded backwards during the overrun, leading to severe damage to the underside of the forward fuselage. The undersides of both wing-mounted engines were flattened and both engines suffered ingestion damage. The main wheels of the aircraft also dug deep troughs in the area beyond the end of the runway, damaging the buried airfield lighting cables. The accident report concluded that the overrun was caused by the inability of the aircraft to achieve the appropriate level of braking effectiveness, and recommended that both the scheduled wet runway performance of the Lockheed L-1011 TriStar and the condition of the surface of runway 14 at Leeds Bradford Airport should be re-examined.
3. On 22 August 1985, British Airtours Flight 28M caught fire after an aborted take off at Manchester Airport while on a charter flight to the Greek island of Corfu. The fuel access panel on the aircraft's fuselage was pierced by a part of the compressor that had been ejected from the port engine as a result of a malfunction. The fire quickly engulfed the area around the rear of the plane filling the cabin with toxic fumes. Fifty-three passengers and two crew members died as a result – most of them dying of asphyxiation after inhaling the fumes.

== Preserved aircraft ==
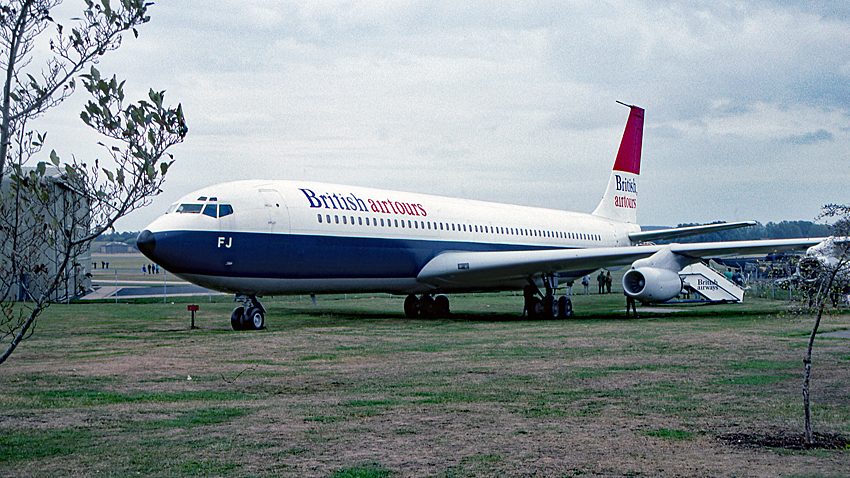
British Airtours G-APFJ B707-436 at Cosford, 1990

Boeing 707-436 G-APFJ was initially preserved at Royal Air Force Museum Cosford as the only surviving B707 with Rolls-Royce Conway engines. The aircraft was scrapped in 2006 and the forward fuselage section was donated to the National Museum of Flight in Scotland.

== See also ==
- List of defunct airlines of the United Kingdom
