= List of Boeing 757 operators =

The following is a list of current Boeing 757 operators.

== Airline operators ==
Airline	Country	200	300	757 fleet	Type
Air Transport International	(United States)	4	-	4	Combi
Alpha Sky	(Kazakhstan)	1	-	1	Cargo
Asia Pacific Airlines	(United States)	4	-	4	Cargo
Aviastar-TU Airlines	(Russia)	5	-	5	Cargo
Azur Air	(Russia)	9	-	9	Pax
Blue Dart Aviation	(India)	6	-	6	Cargo
Cargojet Airways	(Canada)	16	-	16	Cargo
China Air Cargo	(China)	1	-	1	Cargo
China Postal Airlines	(China)	5	-	5	Cargo
Cygnus Air	(Spain)	5	-	5	Cargo
Delta Air Lines	(United States)	76	16	92	Pax
DHL Aero Expreso	(Panama)	4	-	4	Cargo
DHL Air Austria	(Austria)	19	-	19	Cargo
DHL Air UK	(United Kingdom)	5	-	5	Cargo
EAT Leipzig	(Germany)	7	-	7	Cargo
E-Cargo	(Russia)	1	-	1	Cargo
FedEx Express	(United States)	90	-	90	Cargo
Flykhiva	(Uzbekistan)	-	2	2	Pax
Icelandair	(Iceland)	6	-	6	Pax
MIAT Mongolian Airlines	(Mongolia)	1	-	1	Cargo
Morningstar Air Express	(Canada)	9	-	9	Cargo
My Freighter Airlines	(Uzbekistan)	1	-	1	Cargo
North-Western Cargo	(China)	4	-	4	Cargo
Parallel Express	(United States)	1	-	1	Cargo
SCAT Airlines	(Kazakhstan)	3	-	3	Pax
SF Airlines	(China)	43	-	43	Cargo
Sky Guard	(Uzbekistan)	1	-	1	Cargo
Skyline Express	(Ukraine)	-	5	5	Pax
Swiftair	(Spain)	2	-	2	Cargo
United Airlines	(United States)	40	21	61	Pax
United Parcel Service	(United States)	75	-	75	Cargo
West Atlantic	(Sweden)	1	-	1	Cargo
YTO Cargo Airlines	(China)	10	-	10	Cargo
Airliner fleet	Global	455	44	499	B757

== Non-airline operators ==
Operator	Country	200	300	757 fleet
2Excel Aviation	(United Kingdom)	1	-	1
Boeing	(United States)	1	-	1
Comco	(United States)	2	-	2
DSG Aviation II	(United States)	1	-	1
Freedom II	(Bermuda)	1	-	1
Galactic Holdings	(United States)	3	-	3
Honeywell	(United States)	1	-	1
International Air Response	(United States)	1	-	1
President of Argentina	(Argentina)	1	-	1
Royal New Zealand Air Force	(New Zealand)	2	-	2
Samaritan's Purse	(United States)	1	-	1
Saudi Arabian Government	(Saudi Arabia)	1	-	1
Talos Aviation	(British Virgin Islands)	1	-	1
The Trump Organization	(United States)	1	-	1
United States Air Force	(United States)	10	-	10
United States Department of Justice	(United States)	2	-	2
Yucaipa Companies	(United States)	1	-	1
Aircraft fleet	Global	31	-	31

== Former operators ==
Former operators of the Boeing 757 are for example:

=== Boeing 757-200 ===
- Air Europe
- America West Airlines
- American Airlines
- Britannia Airways
- British Airways
- Caledonian Airways
- Eastern Air Lines
- Far Eastern Air Transport
- EVA Air
- First Choice Airways
- Flying Colours
- Inter European Airways
- Jet2.com
- JMC Air
- Monarch Airlines
- MyTravel Airways
- Northwest Airlines
- Thomas Cook Airlines
- Thomson Airways
- Thomsonfly
- Titan Airways
- TUI Airways

=== Boeing 757-300 ===
- Northwest Airlines
- Thomas Cook Airlines

== Orders and deliveries ==
Orders and deliveries sortable, presorted by customer
Customer	Orders						
Customer	757-200	757-200M	757-200PF	757-300	Total	PW	RR
Air Europe	15				15		15
Air Holland	3				3		3
America West Airlines	4				4		4
American Airlines	126				126		126
Arkia				2	2		2
ATA Airlines	13			12	25		25
Azerbaijan Airlines	2				2		2
British Airways	50				50		50
China Southern Airlines	19				19		19
China Southwest Airlines	12				12		12
China Xinjiang Airlines	6				6		6
Condor	17			13	30	17	13
DAE Capital	21		4		25	3	22
Delta Air Lines	116				116	116	
Eastern Air Lines	25				25		25
El Al	7				7		7
Ethiopian Airlines	4		1		5	5	
Far Eastern Air Transport	7				7	7	
GATX	3				3		3
Guinness Peat Aviation	12				12		12
Iberia	24				24		24
Icelandair	7			1	8		8
ILFC	82				82	38	44
KE Aircraft Leasing	2				2		2
LTE International Airways	1				1		1
LTU International	12				12		12
Mexican Air Force	1				1		1
Mid East Jet	1				1	1	
Monarch Airlines	7				7		7
MyTravel Airways	1				1		1
NAS Aviation Services LLC	4				4		4
Nepal Airlines	1	1			2		2
Northwest Airlines	56			16	72	72	
Republic Airlines	6				6		6
Rolls-Royce Holdings	4				4		4
Royal Air Maroc	2				2	2	
Royal Brunei Airlines	3				3		3
Shanghai Airlines	13				13	13	
Singapore Airlines	4				4	4	
Sojitz	2				2		2
Starflite	1				1		1
Sterling Airlines	3				3		3
Thomas Cook Airlines				2	2		2
Trans World Airlines	14				14	14	
Transavia	3				3		3
TUI Group	16				16		16
Turkmenistan Airlines	3				3		3
United Airlines	139			9	148	98	50
United States Air Force	4				4	4	
UPS Airlines			75		75	35	40
US Airways	23				23		23
Uzbekistan Airways	3				3	3	
XiamenAir	9				9		9
Total	913	1	80	55	1,049	432	617
