= CKT =

CKT may refer to:

- Caledonian Airways (1988), former UK airline, ICAO code
- Che Kung Temple station, Hong Kong, MTR station code
- Chukchi language of Siberia, ISO 639-3 code
- Crookston railway station, Glasgow, Scotland, National Rail station code
- CKT (time zone) or UTC−10:00, Cook Islands
- Char kway teow a stir-fried rice noodle dish, a popular noodle dish in Malaysia, Singapore, Brunei and Indonesia
- Club ComuniKT, a sports club in Ambato, Ecuador, best known for basketball
- IOC sport code for cricket at the Summer Olympics
