= Peach Air =

Charter airline of the United Kingdom (1996–1999)

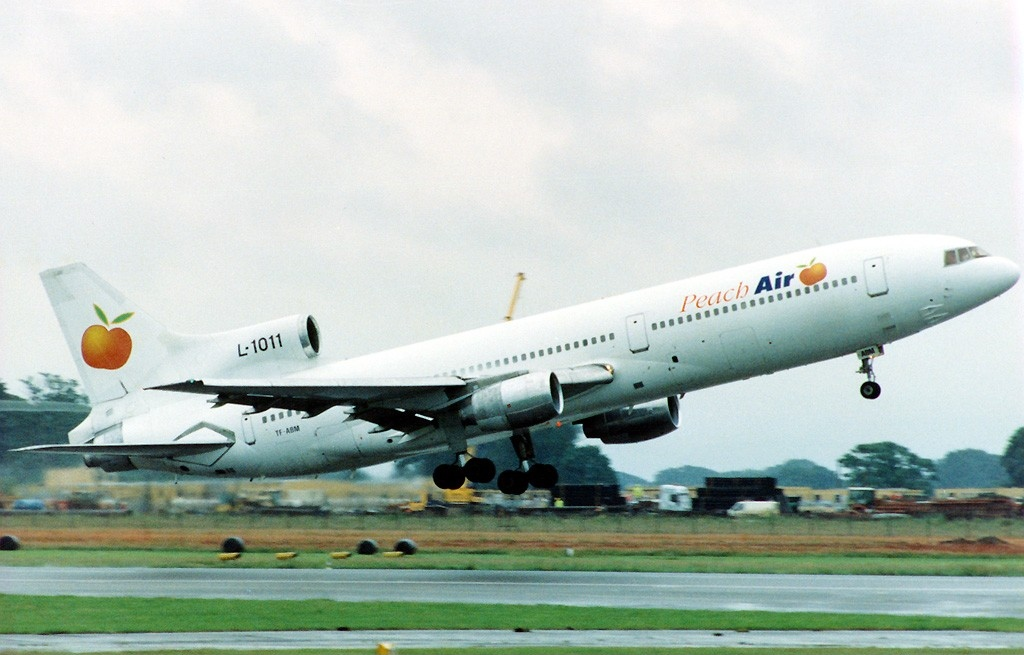
- Lockheed L-1011-385-1 TriStar
IATA	ICAO	Call sign
—	KGC	GOLDCREST
- Founded: 30 October 1996
- Commenced operations: 1 March 1997
- Ceased operations: 1 November 1998 (assets merged into JMC Air)
- Operating bases: Gatwick Airport
- Fleet size: 6
- Parent company: Goldcrest Aviation + Caledonian Airways
- Headquarters: Gatwick Airport

Peach Air was a charter airline in the United Kingdom that operated for two years between 1997 and 1998.

== History ==
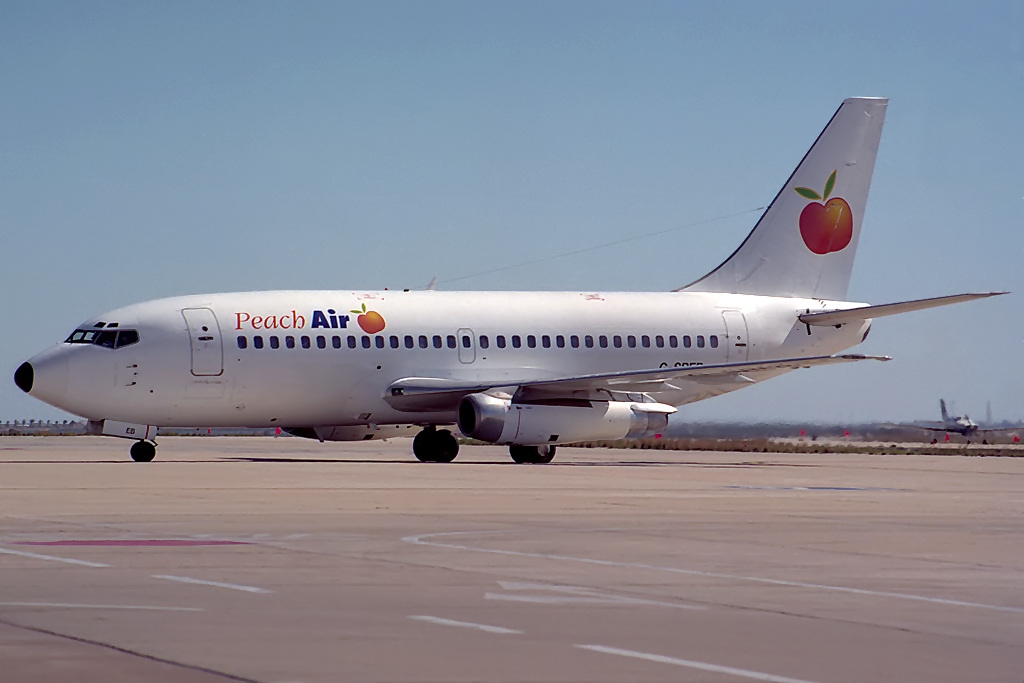
Boeing 737-204(Adv)

Peach Air Ltd. was formed on 30 October 1996. It was a joint venture between Caledonian Airways and charter broker Goldcrest Aviation. Operations began from Manchester and London-Gatwick airports on 1 May 1997, with wet-leased aircraft. The prime inclusive tour contract was to service the Inspirations Group’s budget packages to Mediterranean basin resorts. This business continued until the take-over of the Inspirations holiday company and its subsequent absorption into Flying Colours Airlines, as of October 1998. Peach Air consequently ceased all flight operations on 1 November.

In 1999, Thomas Cook completed the acquisition of Carlson Leisure Group, which operated Flying Colours ordered 2 Airbus A330-200 aircraft to begin long haul operations; these aircraft arrived after the JMC rebrand.

== See also ==
- List of defunct airlines of the United Kingdom
