= 1977 British Airtours Boeing 707 crash =

Plane crash in Scotland

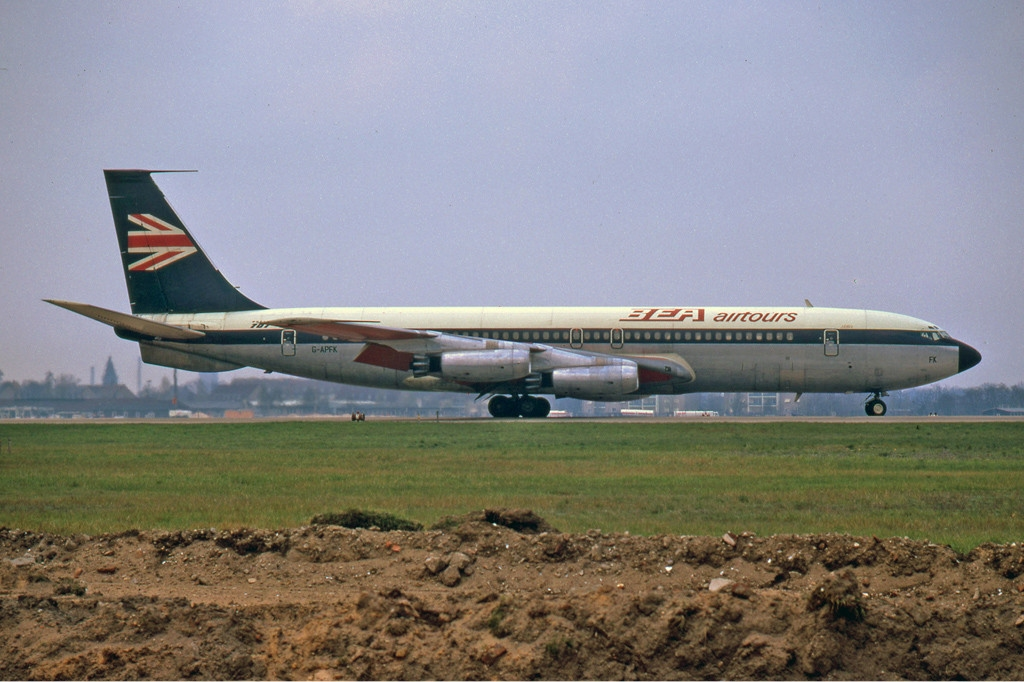
- The aircraft involved in the accident, shown at Berlin-Tegel Airport in 1973.

Accident
- Date: 17 March 1977
- Summary: Loss of control during a training takeoff with simulated engine failure
- Site: Glasgow Prestwick Airport, Scotland, United Kingdom; 55.516°N 4.613°W

Aircraft
- Aircraft type: Boeing 707-436
- Operator: British Airtours
- Registration: G-APFK
- Flight origin: Glasgow Prestwick Airport, Scotland, United Kingdom
- Destination: Glasgow Prestwick Airport, Scotland, United Kingdom
- Occupants: 4
- Crew: 4
- Fatalities: 0
- Injuries: 1
- Survivors: 4

On 17 March 1977, a British Airtours Boeing 707 being used for pilot training crashed and caught fire during its take-off roll at Glasgow Prestwick Airport. All four crew members on board survived.

== Aircraft ==
The aircraft was a Boeing 707-436, registered as G-APFK, and first flew in 1960. Powered by four Rolls-Royce Conway 508 turbines, the aircraft entered service with BOAC on 29 September 1960, transferred to BEA Airtours on 30 December 1971 and finally British Airtours on 1 April 1974.

== Flight ==
On board were: a 29-year-old first officer trainee; a 48-year-old flight commander; a captain trainee who was acting as flight engineer; and a supervisory first officer seated behind the commander. After the standard pushback and engine starting procedures, the commander relayed the crosswind information from the control tower to the trainee first officer, who was in control for the take-off. The wind forecast was 18 knots, increasing to 35 knots. No flight number was assigned to the training session.

== Accident ==
After receiving take-off clearance from the tower, the crew taxied the aircraft to runway 31 for departure. The trainee first officer commenced the take-off run by applying full power to the engines. As the crew rotated the aircraft from VR speed (125 knots (232 km/h; 144 mph)), the flight commander pulled back engine No.1's thrust lever, saying "engine number one's failed" then "I have it". The crew applied left rudder trim and the aircraft climbed to 20–30 feet (6–9 m). The aircraft suddenly began to descend and the left wing dropped 20 degrees. The engine simulated as failing struck the left edge of runway 31. The aircraft then yawed and rolled to the right, and engine No.4 struck the ground. The aircraft slid sideways down the runway, tearing off all four engines and collapsing the landing gear while bursting into flames. It came to rest at the intersection with runway 3. During evacuation one crewman was injured.

== Investigation ==
The Air Accidents Investigation Branch (AAIB) began an investigation the day after the accident. According to the flight data and cockpit recorders, an engine failure would be simulated as an exercise for the two trainees to quickly demonstrate procedures for restarting or shutting down the failed engine. The AAIB determined the pilots did not deal with the failure as quickly as recommended. Usually, a pilot must deal with failed engine in 1 1/2 seconds, but the trainee first officer took 2–3 seconds.

=== Probable cause ===
After investigating the crash for one year and four months, the AAIB published its final report in September 1978, stating the probable cause of the accident: "A loss of control which resulted from a delay in taking full corrective action during a simulated outboard engine failure exercise during take-off."

== Aftermath ==
G-APFK was damaged beyond repair in the accident and fire. It was written off in November 1978 and scrapped in 1979.
