= Caledonian Airways =

Charter airline of the United Kingdom (1961–1970)

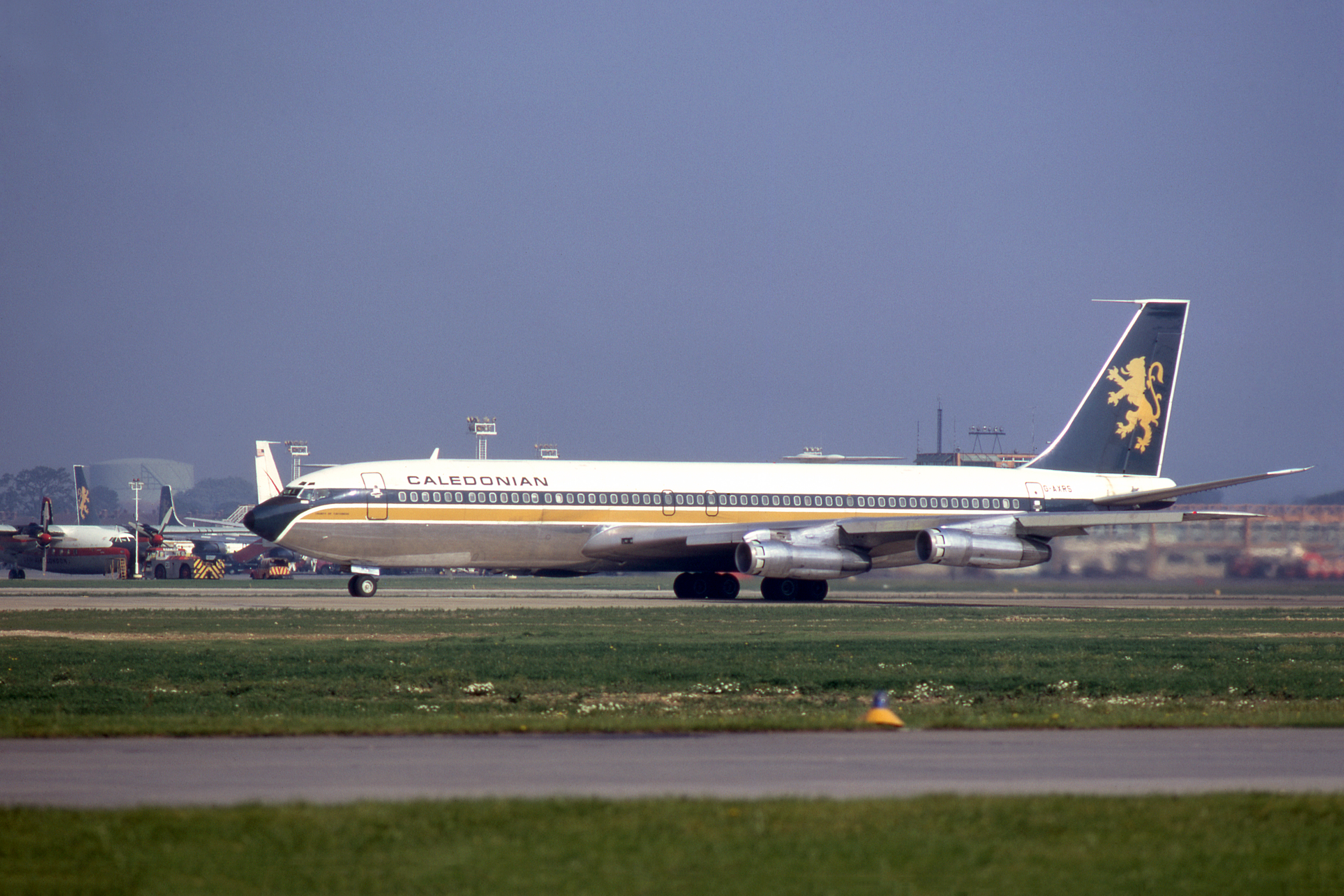
- Boeing 707-320C
IATA	ICAO	Call sign
CA	CA	CALEDONIAN
- Founded: 27 April 1961
- Commenced operations: 29 November 1961
- Ceased operations: 30 November 1970 (merged with British United Airways to form British Caledonian)
- Hubs: Glasgow–Prestwick; London–Gatwick; Manchester
- Parent company: Caledonian Airways Ltd
- Headquarters: Horley, Surrey, England (1961–1965); Crawley, West Sussex, England (1966–1970)
- Key people: Adam Thomson; John de la Haye; Frank A Hope

Caledonian Airways was a wholly private, independent (Note: independent from government-owned corporations) charter airline in the United Kingdom formed in April 1961. It began with a single 104-seat Douglas DC-7C leased from the Belgian flag carrier Sabena. Caledonian grew rapidly over the coming years to become the leading transatlantic "affinity group" charter operator by the end of the decade. During that period, passenger numbers grew from just 8,000 in 1961 to 800,000 in 1970. The latter represented 22.7% of all British non-scheduled passengers. It also became Britain's most consistently profitable and financially most secure independent airline of its era, never failing to make a profit in all its ten years of existence. By the end of 1970, Caledonian operated an all-jet fleet consisting of eleven aircraft and provided employment for over 1,000 workers. At that time, its principal activities included group charters between North America, Europe and the Far East using Boeing 707s, and general charter and inclusive tour (IT) activities in Europe utilising One-Elevens.

In 1970 Caledonian bought British United Airways (BUA), the largest contemporary independent airline and leading private sector scheduled carrier in the United Kingdom, and rebranded as British Caledonian.

== History ==
=== Inception ===
Caledonian Airways was the brainchild of Adam Thomson, a former British European Airways (BEA) Viscount pilot and ex-Britavia captain, and John de la Haye, a former BEA flight steward and Cunard Eagle's erstwhile New York office manager.

Thomson, de la Haye and three associates started Caledonian Airways from scratch with an initial investment of £54,000 raised from institutional investors on both sides of the Atlantic, many of which had a "Scottish connection".

Initially, Thomson, de la Haye (the airline’s first Chairman) and their associates wanted to incorporate the new airline under the name Scottish Airways. When they found out that BEA had already reserved this name, the company was incorporated as Caledonian Airways (Prestwick) Ltd. at Glasgow Prestwick Airport, Scotland, on 27 April 1961 to conduct worldwide IT and group charter operations, with de la Haye and Thomson being appointed managing and deputy managing director respectively.

De la Haye was responsible for the famous Lion livery and tartan outfits for cabin crew. Later, he helped to pioneer business class, the helicopter link between LGW and LHR and the limousine service - some of these innovations were subsequently copied by other airlines. As the initial driver of branding, the famous Caledonian customer service and route expansion, de la Haye is generally recognized as the brainchild behind the airline’s early years and subsequent success, as described in a lengthy obituary in The Times. During the 70’s and early 80’s, having semi-retired due to ill-health, de la Haye retained the position of consultant to Sir Adam Thomson and fought hard to stop fleet diversification, which ultimately contributed to BCAL’s downfall and sale to BA due to huge costs incurred by operating multiple types of aircraft. A close friend of Herb Kelleher (Southwest Airlines) he recognized very early on that diverse fleets incur huge costs and was a strong proponent of keeping it simple.

Caledonian operated its inaugural flight on 29 November 1961 from Gatwick, the newly formed airline's main operating base, to Barbados. The first revenue service, an immigrant charter under contract to London Transport Executive, operated the following day in the opposite direction.

The first fare-paying passengers to New York departed Glasgow Prestwick on 21 December 1961. They had paid £40 for the return trip.

Other destinations served during the first year of operations included Lourenço Marques.

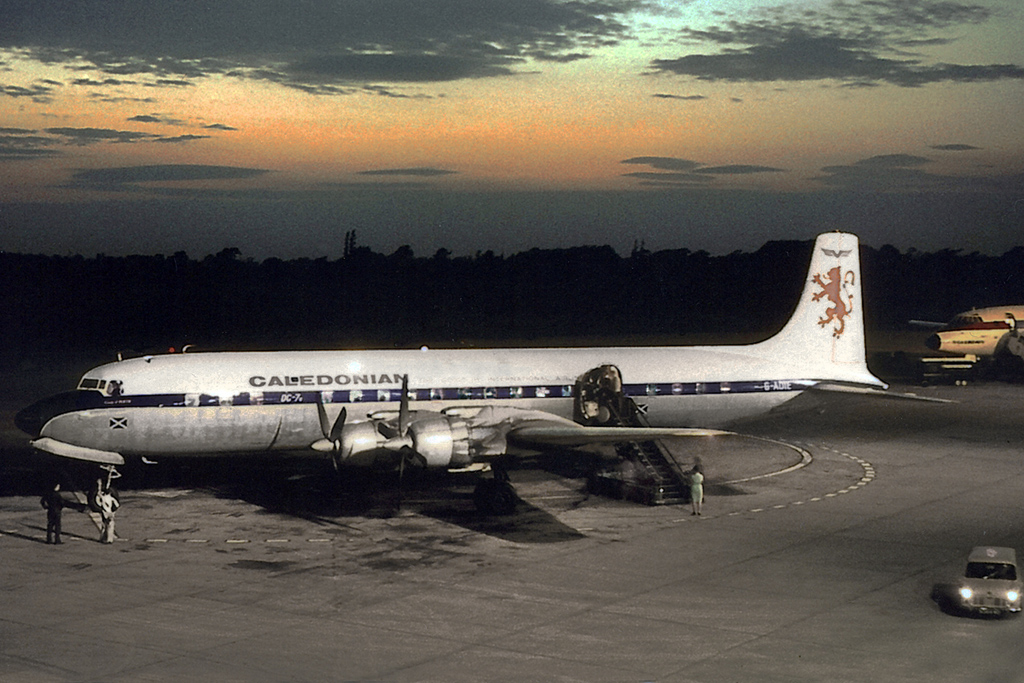
Douglas DC-7C in the original livery at Manchester in July 1964 when operating an inclusive tour flight to Barcelona.

The initial aircraft type operated was the Douglas DC-7C, the first of which was leased from Sabena in November 1961. This aircraft was lost in a fatal accident in Cameroon in March 1962. It was replaced the following month with another aircraft of the same type leased from the same source.

Caledonian's first two DC-7Cs operated European and long-distance charter flights, carrying mainly tour groups, inclusive tour holidaymakers and members of the British Armed Forces. The Ministry of Defence approved Caledonian as a carrier for trooping flights in early 1962. IT flights to European holiday resorts began during summer 1962.

Two Caledonian Airways Douglas DC-7Cs appeared at the Biggin Hill Air Fair in May 1963; one to carry travel trade invitees on a special flight around the English south coast; the other to be viewed by the public while on static display at the airfield.

The DC-7C continued to be the main type flown during the early years. The last example was sold in September 1966.

The airline was emphasising its Scottish roots for marketing purposes by adding the tagline "The Scottish International Airline" immediately behind the Caledonian name on both sides of the aircraft's fuselage, and by its female flight attendants wearing tartan uniforms. The company also sought to attract customers by providing an inflight service that was superior to what most other contemporary charter airlines offered, including complimentary meals, drinks and free overnight bags.

Max Wilson, the chairman of the Overseas Visitors' Club, one of the airline's main group charterers, became Caledonian's first majority shareholder.

In late 1963, the Donaldson Line, a Scottish shipping company, took a 25% minority stake in Caledonian by subscribing to new shares worth £32,000. This provided the resources to expand the airline's freighting activities and to add a pair of DC-6Bs to its fleet in time for the following year's European summer charter season. At the 1963 Biggin Hill Air Fair, Caledonian participated with two of its DC-7Cs. One of the newly acquired DC-6Bs could be viewed by the public while on static display at the 1964 Biggin Hill Air Fair.

=== Attaining market leadership in transatlantic affinity group charters ===
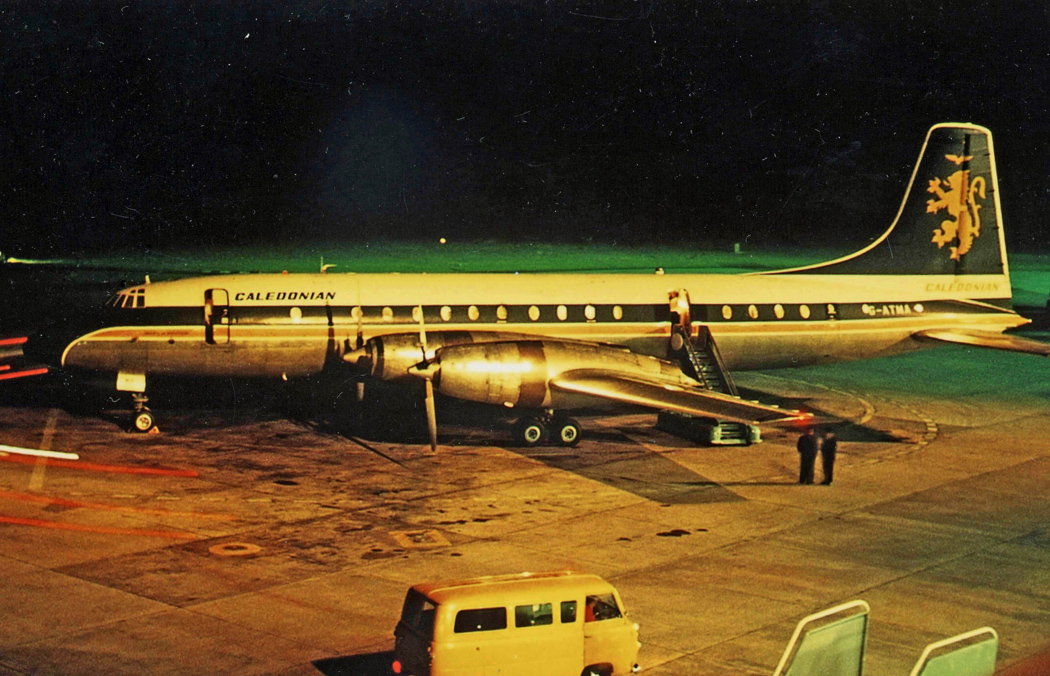
Bristol 175 Britannia 314 in the second corporate livery at Manchester in August 1966

On 20 May 1963, the US Civil Aeronautics Board (CAB), with Chairman and Managing Director John de la Haye as lead negotiator, granted Caledonian a foreign [air] carrier permit for a three-year period under Section 402 of the US Federal Aviation Act. It became effective on 17 June 1963 when it was signed by President John F. Kennedy, making Caledonian the first overseas charter carrier to obtain this permit. The so-called Caledonian Case established a precedent and constituted the legal basis for all airlines that had always wanted to operate charters to and from the US and Canada, but had been unable to overcome the objections of the established airlines, such as Pan Am and British Overseas Airways Corporation (BOAC), prior to the enactment of this law. Caledonian's US breakthrough led to it being granted Canadian affinity group charter permission as well. The UK Air Transport Licensing Board (ATLB) licensed Caledonian to begin North Atlantic IT charters in September 1964.

Caledonian's transatlantic growth strategy focused on taking advantage of strong ethnic ties of overseas Scottish communities in North America to the land of their ancestors and an obscure International Air Transport Association (IATA) resolution dating from 1953. Under this resolution, airlines were permitted to offer cut-price charter tariffs if these were negotiated with an individual representing a distinct group that shared a common affinity among its members prior to the application for charter transportation. (Note: modelled on a similar, 1930s scheme for coach and bus operators) The way independent charter operators like Caledonian, who were not IATA members, interpreted that resolution was that it applied to closed groups only whose primary purpose of travel was their common interest or kinship, rather than securing cheap air fares for its members. IATA imposed further restrictions on airlines seeking to exploit this loophole by insisting that any agent booking these flights had their commission capped at 5%, that the affinity group's membership could not exceed 20,000 and that those seeking to avail themselves of these offers must have been members for at least six months prior to the commencement of travel. These restrictions were designed to protect IATA members' transatlantic scheduled traffic by preventing non-members from undercutting them.

To comply with IATA's arbitrary transatlantic charter rules, Caledonian and other independent charter operators insisted that anyone who wanted a cheap transatlantic charter flight needed to be a bona fide member of an affinity group, and that the prospective traveller needed to be a member of such an organisation for a minimum period of six months. As a result, clubs and associations with names like Friends of Clan Albion, Anglo-Scottish-American Group, Anglo-American Families Association, Rose and Maple Amity Club, Paisley Buddies, British American Club, Canadian US Pacific Association etc. sprang up on both sides of the Atlantic.

As the charterer was responsible for paying for the aircraft's entire capacity regardless of whether all seats were filled, there was a great temptation to let people, who were not eligible to travel under the affinity group rules, take the seats of other, eligible travellers who had cancelled their bookings. As a result, there were numerous occasions on which the airlines got into trouble with the authorities on both sides of the Atlantic. This made the system increasingly unworkable.

In 1967, Caledonian gained Presidential approval to carry passengers from 19 European countries to the US and to operate IT charters from the US to the UK, following authorisation by the CAB. Confirmation by the White House of the CAB's decision to let Caledonian fly US-originating charter passengers to Britain made it at the time the only airline permitted to cater to the IT market on both sides of the Atlantic.

In 1968, the CAB agreed to expand Caledonian's US IT charter authority to enable it to operate circle-tour charters between 19 European points and the US, with flights commencing the following year.

By 1969, more charter passengers were crossing the Atlantic with Caledonian than those flying on the transatlantic scheduled services of Aer Lingus, El Al, Sabena or Swissair.

By 1970, Caledonian was carrying the majority of the approximately 1.4 million (Note: out of a total of eight million) passengers flying as members of affinity groups across the Atlantic each year.

Caledonian sought to differentiate itself from the other UK independent airlines and US supplemental carriers (Note: holders of supplemental air carrier certificates authorised to operate non-scheduled passenger and cargo services to supplement the scheduled operations of certificated route air carriers; airlines holding supplemental air carrier certificates are also known as "nonskeds" in the US) with which it competed in the transatlantic closed group charter market by providing a personalised, high quality full-scheduled-service style inflight service that exceeded most contemporary scheduled transatlantic operators' economy class service standards by a wide margin. On a typical transatlantic 707 charter, there were individually printed menus. The inflight service began with tartan-clad cabin staff serving each passenger free cocktails from the drinks trolley at each seat row as soon as the seat belt signs were turned off. This was followed by the main meal, starting with a separately served hors d'œuvre before serving a main course of fillet of beef, Tournedos, lamb or a chicken dish, accompanied by a selection of complimentary wines. Thereafter, a dessert course was served, followed by a choice from a cheese tray and a basket of fresh fruit. The inflight service concluded with tea or coffee being served with complimentary brandies and liqueurs, as well as free cigarettes for those who smoked.

=== Further growth and new business opportunities ===
Caledonian carried 110,700 passengers and made a net profit of £90,600 in its 1963–64 financial year.

Caledonian's rapid growth as a profitable charter carrier did not satisfy the ambitions of its founders. Thomson and de la Haye's long-term goal was to run a fully fledged scheduled operation. They considered Caledonian's transformation into a scheduled airline the only way to build an airline with a long-term, stable future, rather than continuing to compete with "boom and bust" operators that were charging ruinous rates in an insecure charter market.

Caledonian first applied to the ATLB for a licence to launch transatlantic scheduled services from London to New York via Glasgow Prestwick in 1964. These flights were to operate twice-weekly using DC-7Cs. The fare level was to be similar to Loftleiðir's.

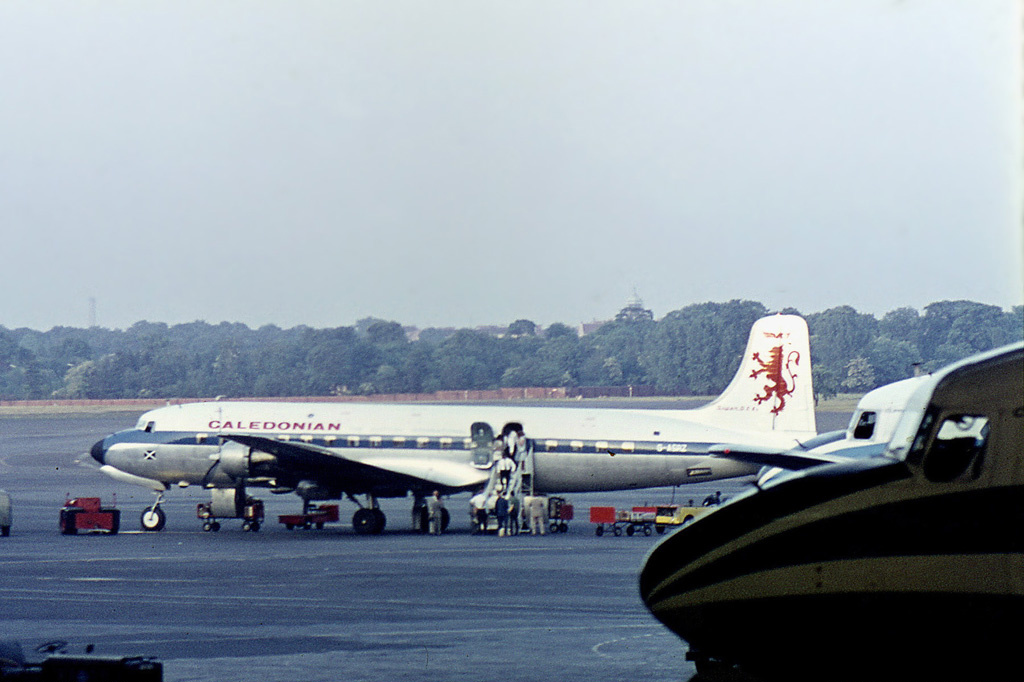
Douglas DC-6B in the first corporate livery at Berlin Tempelhof in June 1964

During summer 1964, Caledonian added two leased Douglas DC-6Bs (Note: sourced from Sabena) to its fleet to complement the DC-7Cs. The additional aircraft enabled Caledonian to operate an expanded European IT charter programme from London Gatwick, Manchester and Glasgow Prestwick. (Note: serving 17 destinations by the end of the decade)

On 21 September 1964, the ATLB announced its decision to reject Caledonian's application for a licence to operate transatlantic scheduled services. It did however award the airline two licences to operate inclusive tours across the North Atlantic. (Note: Caledonian had applied for these licences in addition to a scheduled licence)

In December 1964, Caledonian acquired its first turboprop airliners, a pair of ex-BOAC Bristol 175 Britannia 300 series. These were mainly intended for use on transatlantic IT charters beginning in summer 1965. Over the coming years, additional examples were sourced from BOAC and Canadian Pacific Airlines, enabling the company to continue expanding its worldwide charter business. Britannias gradually replaced DC-7Cs. Caledonian operated a total of nine Britannias, the last of which was disposed of in May 1971. (Note: to IAS Cargo Airlines)

Caledonian carried 148,000 passengers and earned a net profit of just over £200,000 in its 1965–66 financial year.

The ATLB granted Caledonian five licences to operate scheduled services from Scotland to the Med in 1966. These were the airline's first scheduled service licences.

By the end of September 1966, Industrial and Commercial Finance Corporation (ICFC), one of the two predecessors of Investors in Industry, (Note: 3i's former name) acquired a 14% stake in Caledonian's holding company. This improved access to capital to finance further growth, including new business ventures and fleet renewal.

Caledonian planned to introduce twice-weekly services from Prestwick to Barcelona and Ibiza for the 1967 summer season, making use of the licences the ATLB had awarded it the year before. However, these plans were shelved due to the Spanish authorities' refusal to grant reciprocal traffic rights.

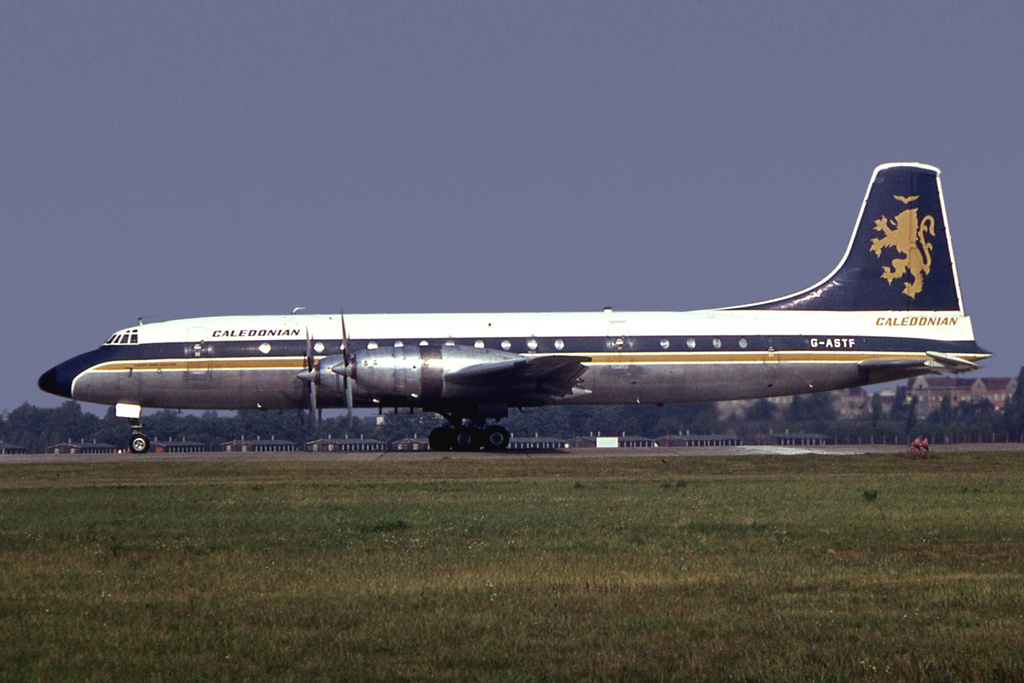
Bristol 175 Britannia 314 at Berlin Tegel in October 1967

During 1967, both Lyle Shipping and Great Universal Stores (GUS) became new shareholders of Caledonian Airways. These investments ended a period of uncertainty for the airline following the Donaldson Line's voluntary liquidation. Lyle Shipping's purchase of shares worth £125,000 increased Caledonian's issued capital and reserves to £1 million. GUS were the owners of the Global travel organisation, a leading contemporary UK tour operator that contracted a growing share of its flying business to Caledonian. It acquired Donaldson's 20% stake.

Caledonian re-applied to the ATLB for a licence to launch transatlantic scheduled services from Gatwick, Heathrow or Stansted via Prestwick to New York JFK, Chicago, Los Angeles, San Francisco and Toronto, and from Birmingham via Prestwick to New York, in 1967. These services were to be gradually introduced between 1969/70 and 1970/71 utilising the new 707s. BUA, British Eagle and Transglobe Airways simultaneously applied for similar licences. Caledonian objected to the other independent airlines' applications. BOAC opposed all the independents' applications. The Board of Trade (BOT) directed the ATLB to prejudge the four contenders' applications in order to concentrate only on those that stood a reasonable chance of success under existing bilateral arrangements before the route licensing hearings could begin. As a result, BUA withdrew its own applications but objected to Caledonian's and British Eagle's. Transglobe withdrew its applications as well. Caledonian and British Eagle objected to each other's applications. The ATLB heard Caledonian's applications, British Eagle's counter applications and BOAC's objections in early 1968. Following the conclusion of the transatlantic scheduled licensing hearings in mid-1968, the ATLB rejected Caledonian's and British Eagle's applications. It felt that the independents generally lacked the financial strength to acquire the then latest widebodied and supersonic transport (SST) aircraft for their proposed services, and that these airlines had insufficient economies of scale to enable them to compete with BOAC and the American carriers on a level playing field. It also felt that it would take the independents too long to make these services profitable. In Caledonian's case, the ATLB found that despite having a dedicated North American sales force and its own ground handling operation at John F. Kennedy Airport, the airline's lack of any kind of scheduled service experience and its almost total reliance on Sabena's and Aviation Traders' (Note: Southend-based BUA associate Aviation Traders was contracted to maintain Caledonian's Britannia fleet) engineering support counted against granting it a scheduled service licence for one of the most competitive air markets in the world. Secondary factors for the ATLB's rejection of Caledonian's applications included the delay in the introduction of Concorde and the non-availability within the envisaged timeframe of widebodied aircraft that were smaller and carried a lower price tag than the Boeing 747, which would have made them better suited to the type of operation proposed.

Caledonian's net profit grew to nearly £550,000 on turnover of £16.7 million in its 1969–70 financial year.

In spring 1970, Caledonian won a renewable, one-year contract from Qantas to carry migrants from Europe to Australia. The initial contract was worth £4.3 million. It was a sub-charter providing for the carriage of up to 40,000 passengers on approximately 220 flights.

=== Becoming an all-jet operator ===
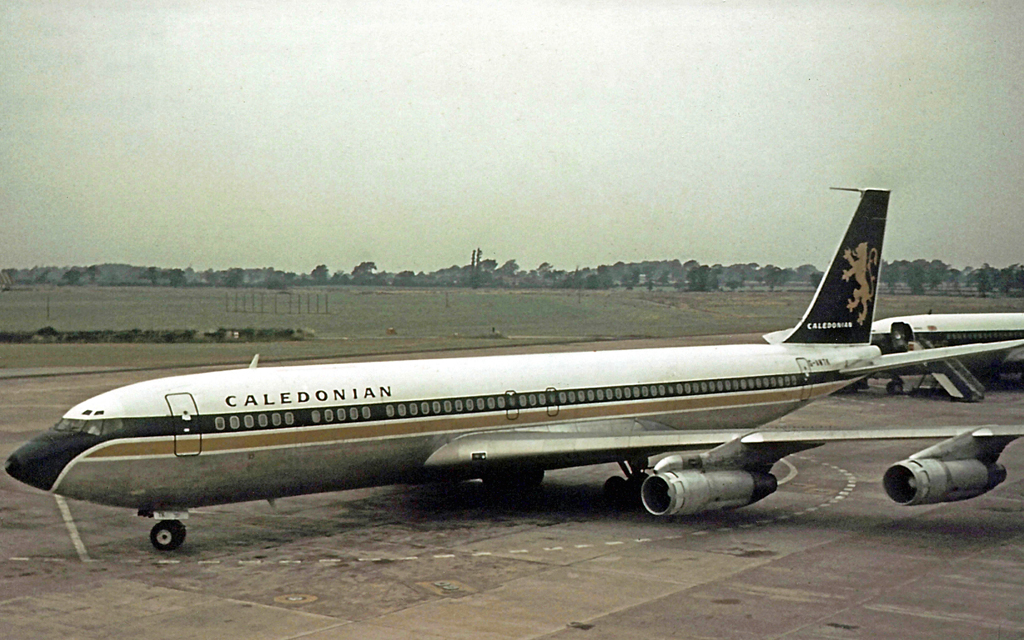
Boeing 707-349C departing from Manchester Airport in 1969 just before a transatlantic passenger charter flight

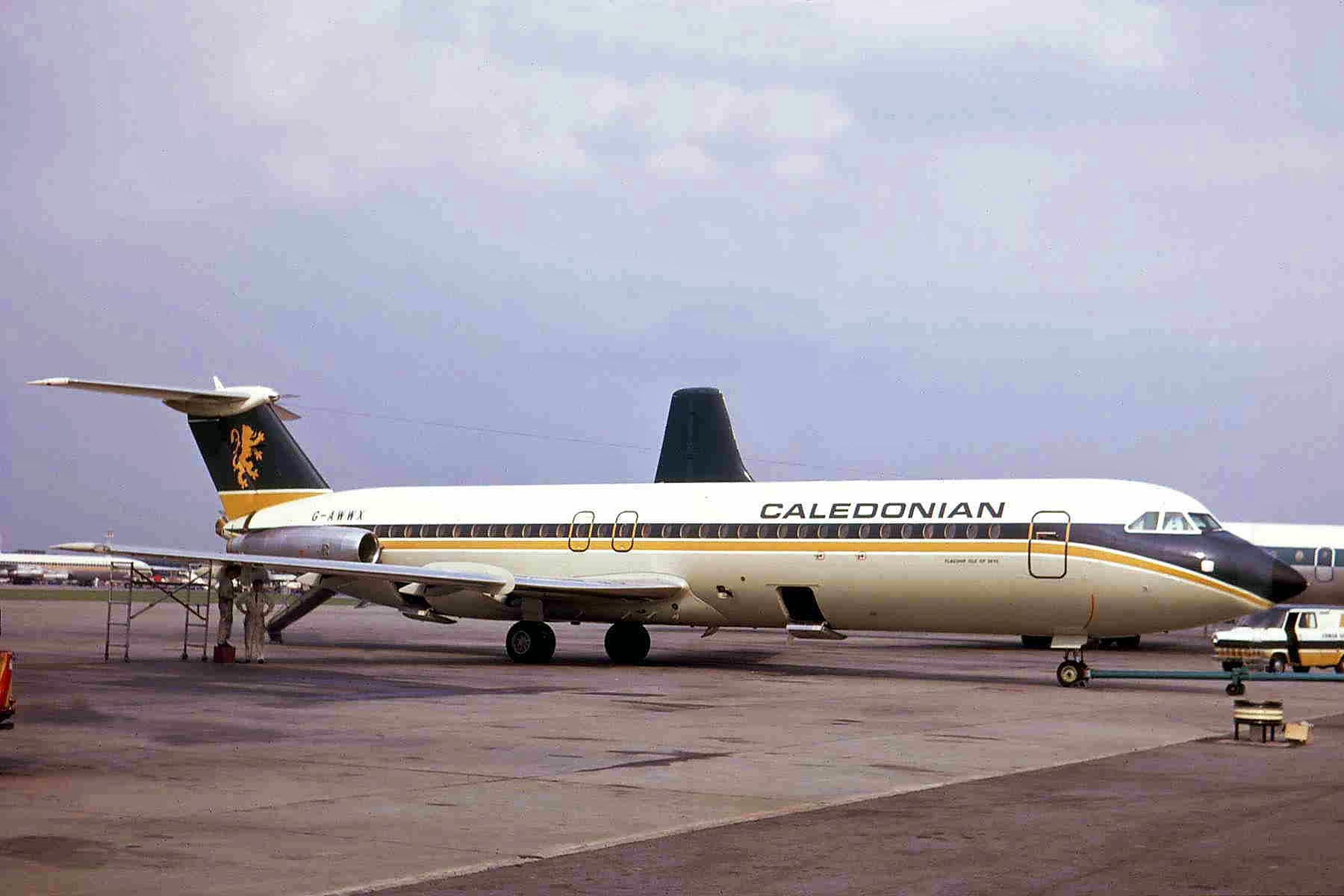
BAC One-Eleven 509EW at Gatwick in April 1969

From 1968, the Britannias were gradually replaced with state-of-the-art Boeing 707 jet equipment on long-haul routes. BAC One-Eleven 500s replaced the remaining Britannias on the company's short-/medium-haul European IT operations from 1969.

When Caledonian's senior management began evaluating competing state-of-the-art jet aircraft types as potential replacements for the Britannia in its long-haul role in the mid-1960s, the Boeing 707 320C series was favoured because of its superior range and payload compared with its contemporary rivals. Caledonian planned to place an order directly with Boeing for two convertible 707-320Cs that could either be operated in an all-passenger or all-cargo configuration and featured a large freight door on the left-hand side of the forward fuselage to enable carriage of main deck cargo when configured as a freighter. The initial order needed to be placed before the end of 1965 to secure the first aircraft's delivery in May 1967, just in time for that year's summer season. To avoid paying the 14% tax the UK Government had imposed on imported, new foreign aircraft to protect competing British models, Caledonian needed to persuade the BOT that there was no equivalent home-grown alternative. It also cited the BOT's earlier decision to approve BOAC's application for an import duty waiver on two new Boeing 707-336Cs as a precedent. However, the BOT was unwilling to grant Caledonian the requested tax exemption and was instead assisting Vickers in selling it the Super VC10, the stretched version of the original "standard" VC10 and Britain's answer to the all-American 707 and DC-8. Despite the BOT's and Vickers's best efforts, Caledonian's senior management remained unconvinced that the Super VC10 was a worthy competitor of the 707. The results of its evaluation had shown that the Super VC10 was not competitive with the 707, in terms of amortisation, resale value and availability of finance due to its small production run. Apart from its insufficient range to fly non-stop from the UK to the US West Coast with a viable payload, significantly smaller cargo capacity and lack of passenger/freighter convertibility, the Super VC10 was also heavier than the 707. This increased fuel consumption. In its ongoing negotiations with the BOT, Caledonian cited these findings as evidence that there was no suitable British alternative to the 707 for the envisaged role. The BOT however continued to insist that irrespective of Caledonian's specific requirements, the 707 and Super VC10 were equivalent and, based on this assessment, refused the airline's application for an import duty waiver. Meanwhile, the civil engine production hold-up caused by the Vietnam War resulted in the first aircraft arriving in July rather than May 1967. This did not allow its utilisation for that year's full summer charter season precluding a profitable operation. These circumstances compelled Caledonian to lease out its first 707 to the Flying Tiger Line until May 1968. To facilitate the 707's smooth introduction into service the following summer, Caledonian required access at its Gatwick base to its second aircraft (ordered in 1966) for as much as winter 1967–68 as possible to complete aircrew and ground support training in time for the following summer season. This was not possible as long as the standoff between the airline and the BOT continued. To avoid having an expensive, new jet aircraft sit idly on the ground in the absence of a timely resolution, the airline's senior management put in place a contingency plan to transfer the 707 training programme to Shannon Airport as the BOT had no jurisdiction over the Republic of Ireland. In the event, the contingency plan was not activated as a compromise was reached in early December 1967 that resulted in the BOT granting Caledonian's request for an import duty exemption. This permitted the airline to import the aircraft into the UK free of duty, as long as non-stop sectors outside the Super VC10's economically viable range accounted for a significant share of its operations. It enabled Caledonian to take delivery of its second 707, a 399C series aircraft bearing the registration G-AVTW ("Tango Whisky"), at Gatwick on 30 December 1967. The first aircraft – Boeing 707-399C G-AVKA ("Kilo Alpha") – joined the second at Gatwick on 1 June 1968, following the end of the Flying Tigers lease. Both began operating a series of charters, carrying 15,000 passengers from Los Angeles and Oakland to the UK.

Caledonian's short-haul re-equipment effort to replace the remaining obsolete piston and turboprop airliners in its fleet, initially focused on Boeing's 737. It intended to place an order for three series 200 aircraft before the end of 1967. The aircraft were to be delivered by spring 1969 to accomplish the transition to an all-jet fleet ahead of the 1969 summer charter season. As the 737 was an all-American aircraft like the previously ordered 707, Caledonian needed to approach the BOT once more to request an import tax exemption. Predictably, the BOT opposed this. It threatened to withdraw the tax concession it had granted the airline to import brand-new 707s free of duty if 737s were selected instead of One-Eleven 500s. Caledonian did not favour the One-Eleven 500 because it could not match the 737-200's range, which was reckoned sufficient to fly British holidaymakers non-stop from the UK to the Canary Islands and to destinations in the Eastern Mediterranean, as well as lower costs per seat mile as a result of the latter's wider fuselage accommodating a greater number of passengers seated six (rather than five) across. In the cut-throat short-/medium-haul charter airline business these were important cost and marketing advantages that could make all the difference between profit and loss. In addition to the risk of losing the BOT's tax concession to import new 707s duty-free into the UK outweighing the 737-200s range and cost advantage over the One-Eleven 500, sterling's devaluation together with increases in Boeing's basic sales price had made ordering One-Elevens more attractive financially. Based on an order for four aircraft valued at £7.5 million, buying an equivalent number of 737s was £1–1.5 million more expensive. Another factor swinging Caledonian's short-haul re-equipment decision in favour of the British aircraft was the manufacturer's ability to offer the Scottish airline a high-density, 109-seat version featuring an increased range of 1,580 mi (2,540 km) (compared with 1,150 mi (1,850 km) for the baseline 97-seat, single-class One-Eleven 500 ordered by BEA). This brought most of the Mediterranean and North Africa within range. These considerations resulted in Caledonian placing an order for three One-Eleven 500s for delivery in 1969. It also took out an option on a fourth aircraft, which was to be delivered in 1970 if confirmed.

Caledonian Airways' acquisition of a 40% stake in tour operator Blue Sky Holidays' parent company Blue Cars (Note: a coach tour operator founded by Captain Ted Langton in the 1930s to organise coach tours from the North of England to Devon and Cornwall) for £1.3 million in January 1970 had secured sufficient additional short- and medium-haul charter work to enable the airline to convert the option it held on a fourth One-Eleven 500 into a firm order in time for that year's summer season.

By the time Caledonian acquired BUA from British and Commonwealth (B&C) in late November 1970, it operated a fleet of eleven state-of-the-art jet aircraft comprising seven Boeing 707-320Cs and four BAC One-Eleven 500s and had more than 1,000 employees.

=== A new "Second Force" ===
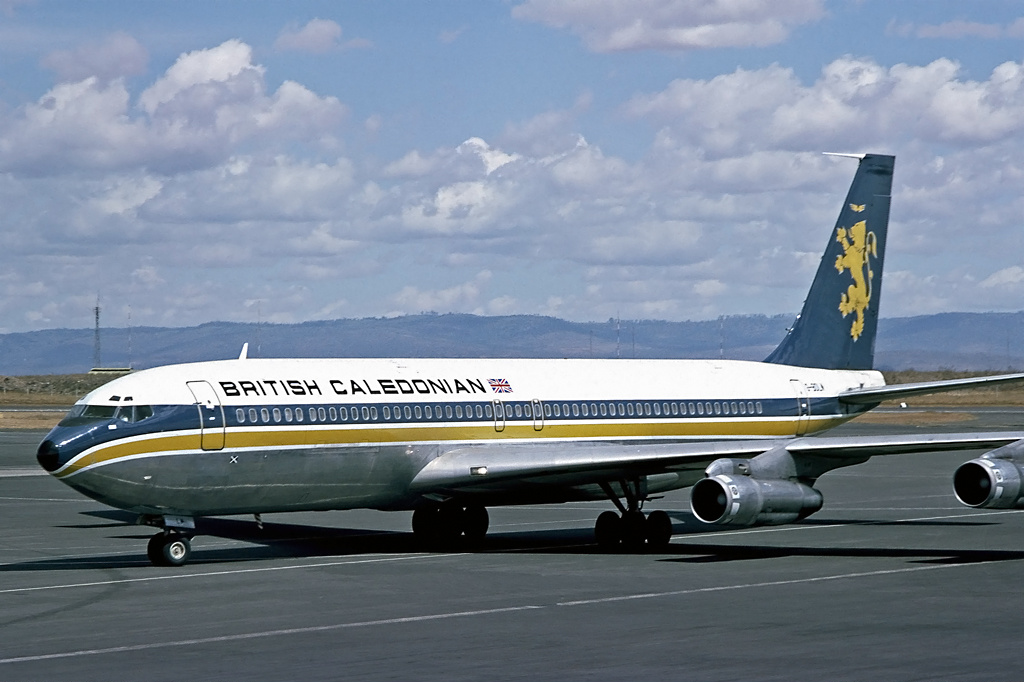
Boeing 707-338C of British Caledonian, Caledonian's successor, at Nairobi Embakasi in February 1976

In the late 1960s, a parliamentary committee of inquiry headed by Professor Sir Ronald Edwards, at the time the chairman of the Electricity Council and a professor at the London School of Economics, inquired into the UK's air transport industry and its prospects in the coming decade. At the conclusion of its inquiry, on 2 May 1969, the Edwards committee published a 394-page report entitled British Air Transport in the Seventies.

==== Concept ====
One of the Edwards report's recommendations was the creation of a financially and managerially sound, so-called Second Force private sector airline to operate a viable network of short- and long-haul scheduled and non-scheduled services. This "Second Force" airline was to be licensed to compete with state-owned BEA and BOAC on selected short-/long-haul routes, in accordance with the relevant bilateral air transport agreements. Wherever bilateral agreements permitted a second British carrier, the "Second Force" was to assume this role. The "Second Force" was to be assisted in attaining critical mass by way of a limited route transfer from the corporations, both of which accounted for more than 90% of all UK scheduled air transport capacity in the late 1960s. In return, the "National Air Holdings Board" that was to assume control of the corporations was to be given a minority stake in the "Second Force" and at least one seat on its board. To enable the "Second Force" to become viable by 1980, its minimum size was to be at least 4 billion long-haul scheduled service seat miles (6.4 billion seat kilometres) per annum by 1975, and its fleet was to consist of at least 14 state-of-the-art long-haul aircraft, including three SSTs, three widebodied trijets and eight conventional narrow-bodied jets.

The Edwards committee considered BUA and Caledonian the two main constituents of the envisaged "Second Force" among Britain's numerous contemporary independent airlines.

==== Creation ====
Following publication of the Edwards report, both BUA and Caledonian pitched for the role of the "Second Force" airline.

BUA's bid to become the new "Second Force" centred on a six-year expansion plan (Note: formulated in 1969 in response to Edwards for the period 1970–1975) that envisaged the progressive transfer of all of BOAC's African routes to itself to complement existing African services from the airline's Gatwick base, and unlimited frequencies between Gatwick and New York's John F. Kennedy Airport. This route transfer was to be accomplished by 1975 (Note: beginning with the transfer of East African routes in 1971, to be followed by Central, West and South African routes in 1972, 73 and 75 respectively) while widebodied services to New York were to begin in 1974. (Note: by which time BUA reckoned to be big enough to launch commercially viable transatlantic scheduled services with Lockheed L-1011s, McDonnell-Douglas DC-10s or an aircraft based on a late-1960s "sub-jumbo" design proposal Boeing had jointly developed with Aeritalia under the working title "Boeing 767") The plan also hinted at a subsequent transfer of the corporation's Caribbean and South American routes to strengthen BUA's role as the new British North-South long-haul airline while leaving BOAC to concentrate on becoming the UK's East-West long-haul carrier. BUA reckoned that this would give it the critical mass and rational route network to meet the Edwards committee's minimum requirement of 4 billion annual scheduled long-haul seat miles (6.4 billion seat kilometres) to become an economically viable "Second Force".

Caledonian opposed BUA's advocacy of large-scale route transfers from the corporations. Rather than creating spheres of influence between the corporations and the independents, it advocated organic development through new licensing opportunities that would permit competition with the corporations on an equal footing, especially on North Atlantic routes, and security of tenure upon which to build a sound economic future.

Meanwhile, as a result of its disappointing financial performance, BUA became a growing burden on the Cayzers', BUA's controlling shareholders. This situation was made worse by the unexpected loss of one of its most important IT customers to the newly formed BEA Airtours. These events led to an approach to both corporations, with the intention of selling BUA to one of them. BEA, which was approached first, refused because it considered the price Sir Nicholas was asking for BUA – £9 million – too high. A subsequent approach to BOAC proved to be more successful. Sir Keith Granville, BOAC's then managing director, agreed to purchase BUA from B&C for £7.9 million. Roy Mason, at the time the President of the Board of Trade, gave the Government's preliminary approval to BOAC's proposed takeover of BUA, on the understanding that there were no realistic prospects of a merger with another independent airline as recommended in the Edwards report. When the details of this supposedly confidential agreement were leaked to the press, Caledonian, which had expressed its interest in acquiring BUA itself and had begun negotiations with BUA's senior management on 5 March 1970 to make an offer to take over the ailing airline to create the "Second Force" as envisaged in the Edwards report, immediately applied to the ATLB for the revocation of all of BUA's scheduled route licences, requesting them to be transferred to itself. It also leaked its own version of this story to The Observer. Following this revelation, Roy Mason made a statement to the House of Commons affirming that B&C had misled him about the prospects of forming a "Second Force" airline through a merger with another independent, and that he was therefore going to withhold his final approval of the BOAC-BUA merger. This opened the way for Caledonian to make a successful counter bid for BUA, seeing off competition from that airline's former managing directors Freddie Laker and Alan Bristow and from Channel Airways chairman Jack Jones. In its fight to win control of BUA, Caledonian had launched a parallel campaign to gain the support of BUA's unions for its proposed merger. As part of this campaign, it had coined the slogans "Better off at Caledonian" and "Better under Adam". Caledonian had also considered a merger with Britannia Airways as a fallback option in case the preferred option of merging with BUA had failed to materialise.

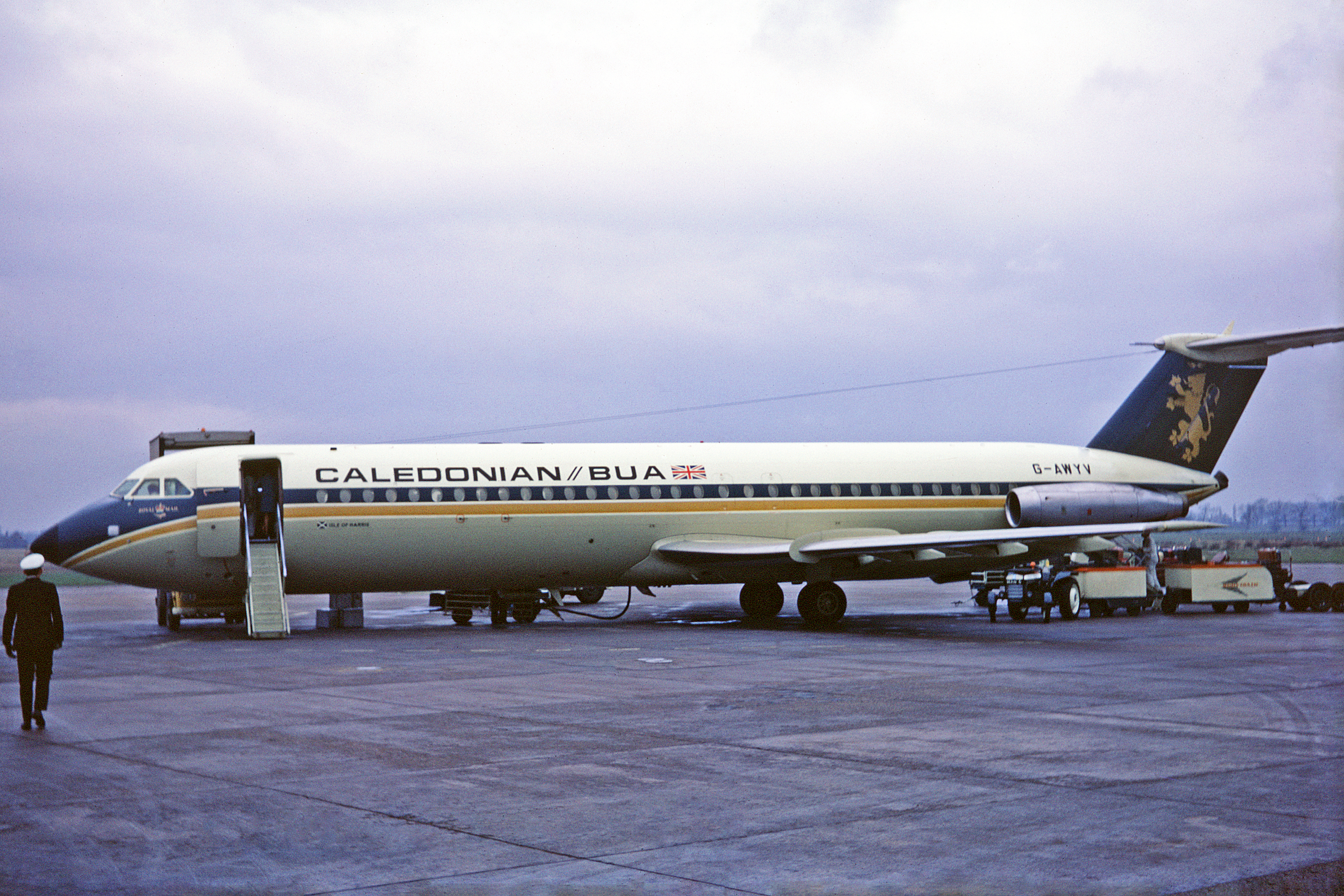
BAC One-Eleven 509EW with double titles Caledonian-BUA at Manchester in March 1971

On 30 November 1970, Caledonian merged with BUA. Initially operating under the interim name Caledonian//BUA, the merged entity adopted the British Caledonian name as of September 1971. During the 1970s and '80s, British Caledonian became the UK's largest independent, international scheduled airline, with an extensive global route network serving over 40 destinations in around 25 countries on five continents.

== Fleet ==
Caledonian operated the following aircraft types during its ten-year history:

- BAC One-Eleven 500 series
- Boeing 707-320C
- Bristol 175 Britannia 300 series
- Douglas DC-6B
- Douglas DC-7C

=== Fleet in 1962 ===
In April 1962, Caledonian's fleet comprised just one aircraft.

Caledonian fleet in April 1962
Aircraft	Number
Douglas DC-7C	1
Total	1

The airline's sole aircraft was leased from Sabena and ca. 40 people were employed during the first year of operation.

=== Fleet in 1965 ===
In April 1965, Caledonian's fleet comprised six aircraft.

Caledonian fleet in April 1965
Aircraft	Number
Bristol 175 Britannia 312	2
Douglas DC-7C	4
Total	6

One of the airline's DC-7Cs was leased from Sabena and another Britannia 312 was due to be delivered. 220 people were employed.

=== Fleet in 1967 ===
In September 1967, Caledonian's fleet comprised seven aircraft.

Caledonian fleet in September 1967
Aircraft	Number
Boeing 707-399C	1
Bristol 175 Britannia 300	6
Total	7

Another 707-399C was due to be delivered the following year. 325 people were employed.

=== Fleet in 1969 ===
In April 1969, Caledonian's fleet comprised eleven aircraft.

Caledonian fleet in April 1969
Aircraft	Number
Boeing 707-399C	2
Boeing 707-349C	2
BAC One-Eleven 509EW	3
Bristol 175 Britannia 314	3
Bristol 175 Britannia 312	1
Total	11

Another One-Eleven 509EW was due to be delivered the following year. 850 people were employed.

=== Fleet in 1970 ===
In March 1970, Caledonian's fleet comprised 13 aircraft.

Caledonian fleet in March 1970
Aircraft	Number
Boeing 707-320C	5
BAC One-Eleven 509EW	4
Bristol 175 Britannia 314	3
Bristol 175 Britannia 312	1
Total	13

1,000 people were employed.

== Accidents and incidents ==
During its ten-year existence Caledonian suffered two accidents, one of which was fatal.

The fatal accident occurred on 4 March 1962. A Douglas DC-7C named Star of Robbie Burns (registration: G-ARUD) operating the Douala—Lisbon sector of Caledonian Airways flight 153 (a Lourenço Marques – Luxembourg charter on behalf of Trans Africa Air Coach of London) crashed shortly after a night takeoff from Douala Airport's runway 12, killing all 111 occupants (ten crew and 101 passengers). At the time of the accident, the weather was very hot and humid. After a long takeoff run on the airport's 9,350 ft (2,850 m) long runway, the aircraft gained insufficient height to clear the trees close to the runway end. The aircraft's port wing struck trees 72 ft (22 m) above aerodrome elevation, some 2,300 yd (2,100 m) from the runway end and 500 yd (460 m) from the extended centreline. This resulted in the aircraft crashing into a tidal swamp and exploding on impact. Although this was the only fatal accident in Caledonian's history, it was the deadliest air disaster in British aviation history at the time. The commission of inquiry probing the accident determined that the evidence at the crash site seemed to suggest that a jammed elevator spring tab mechanism prevented the aircraft from attaining sufficient height to clear the obstacles in the runway end's vicinity. This would have resulted in abnormal elevator control forces during takeoff. It was also consistent with tests showing this to prolong takeoff runs that had an attendant risk of losing height during flap retraction when the aircraft became airborne. The commission of inquiry also described a number of adverse features that might have aggravated the circumstances in which the accident occurred. It had furthermore not been able to exclude the possibility of an instrument failure as a probable accident cause as the instruments were either not recovered or too damaged for a valid expert examination.

The non-fatal accident occurred on 28 September 1964. A Douglas DC-7C (registration: G-ASID) operating Caledonian's flight 355 from London Gatwick via Istanbul Yeşilköy to Singapore crash-landed 236 ft (72 m) short of the threshold of Yeşilköy's runway 24 when the aircraft's left main gear struck the ground in line with the runway. This had caused the aircraft to bounce and touch down again 14m further on, which in turn resulted in the nose gear collapsing and engines no. 1 and 2 breaking off, followed by the separation of the entire port wing. The fuselage, which skidded 850 ft (260 m) down the runway, caught fire. Although the aircraft was completely destroyed, all 97 occupants (eight crew and 89 passengers) miraculously survived. The crash-landing followed an abandoned approach to Yeşilköy's runway 24 in heavy rain. The approach was abandoned because the pilot-in-command could not see the runway lights. During the second approach VHF communications were lost for a short time due to the tower transmitter's failure. When transmission resumed, the plane's flightdeck crew reported lightning and heavy turbulence during its descent, and sighting the runway while descending to 500 ft (150 m). This was followed by a slight correction to the right when the pilot-in-command ordered the deployment of full flaps and a reduction in power. It resulted in the plane sinking too quickly just short of the runway. Ordering an immediate increase in power did not prevent the plane from touching the ground short of the runway threshold. The subsequent accident investigation concluded that the probable cause was threefold:

1. the late selection of full flaps and power reduction during the second approach,
2. the crew's inability to control the height precisely due to heavy rain and poor visibility, and
3. the delay in ordering a power increase. The latter resulted in the aircraft undershooting the runway.

== See also ==
- List of defunct airlines of the United Kingdom
