= Caledonian Airways (1988) =

Charter airline of the United Kingdom (1988–2000)

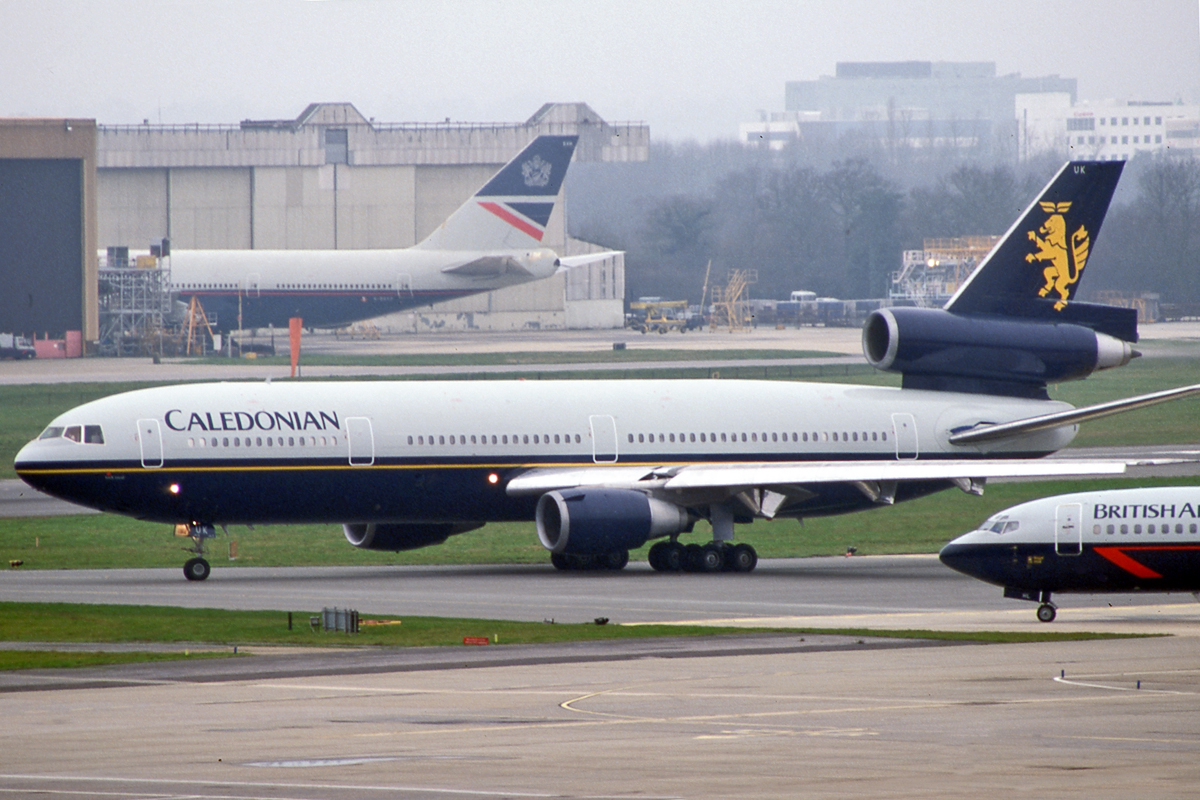
- McDonnell Douglas DC-10-30 at Gatwick Airport in February 1995
IATA	ICAO	Call sign
KT	CKT	CALEDONIAN
- Founded: 14 April 1988
- Ceased operations: 2000 (merged with Flying Colours to form JMC Air)
- Operating bases: London–Gatwick; Manchester
- Parent company: British Airways (1988–1995); Carlson Group (1995–2000)
- Headquarters: Gatwick Airport

Caledonian Airways was a charter airline in the United Kingdom established in 1988 by British Airways after it took over British Caledonian. It merged with Flying Colours Airlines to form JMC Air in 2000.

== History ==
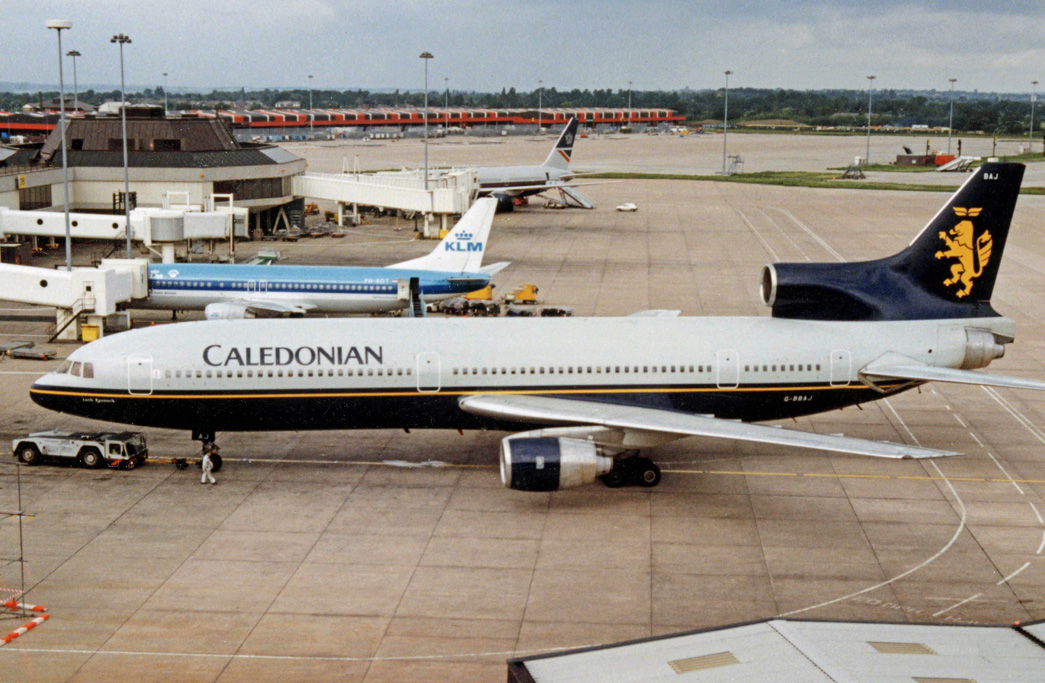
Caledonian Lockheed L-1011 TriStar at Manchester Airport in June 1993

British Airways, adopted the popular Caledonian name in Spring 1988 when the newly privatised main air carrier had completed the takeover of its former Gatwick-based rival British Caledonian Airways. Legally the airline had been registered on 10 December 1987 as Caledonian Airways Ltd. The new air carrier also adopted a modified livery adapted from the contemporary, Landor Associates designed British Airways livery. The new airline moved the Gatwick operation from the airport's South Terminal into the then brand-new North Terminal, thereby concentrating most of the British Airways group's Gatwick services in the new terminal.

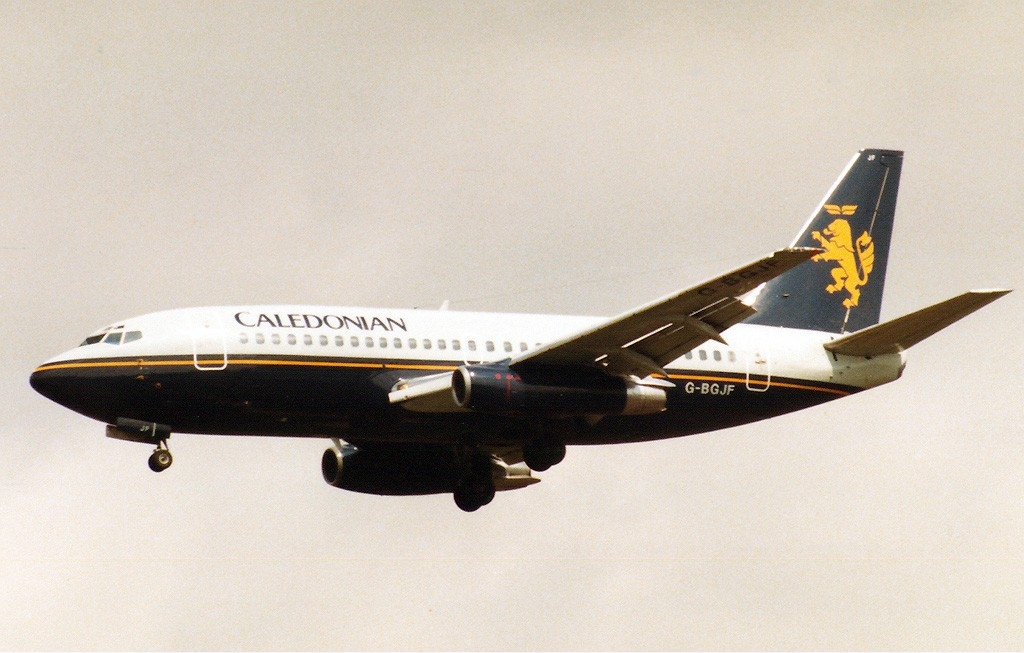
Boeing 737

In 1995, British Airways decided to exit the short-to medium-haul holiday market and to sell the subsidiary to UK-based tour operator Inspirations, then part of the US-owned Carlson group, along with its core fleet of five Tristars. Immediately after the 757s were returned to British Airways. Between 1997 and 1998 Caledonian Airways operated four aircraft under the name Peach Air. Inspirations became part of the Thomas Cook Group in 1999, and Caledonian Airways was merged with the Flying Colours airline to form JMC Air Services, which in turn became the UK arm of the now-defunct Thomas Cook Airlines. Following Inspirations' takeover by Thomas Cook, the Tristars were withdrawn from service as these had suffered increasing, widely publicised reliability problems resulting in the travelling public's generally poor perception of 2nd Caledonian Airways.

== Fleet ==
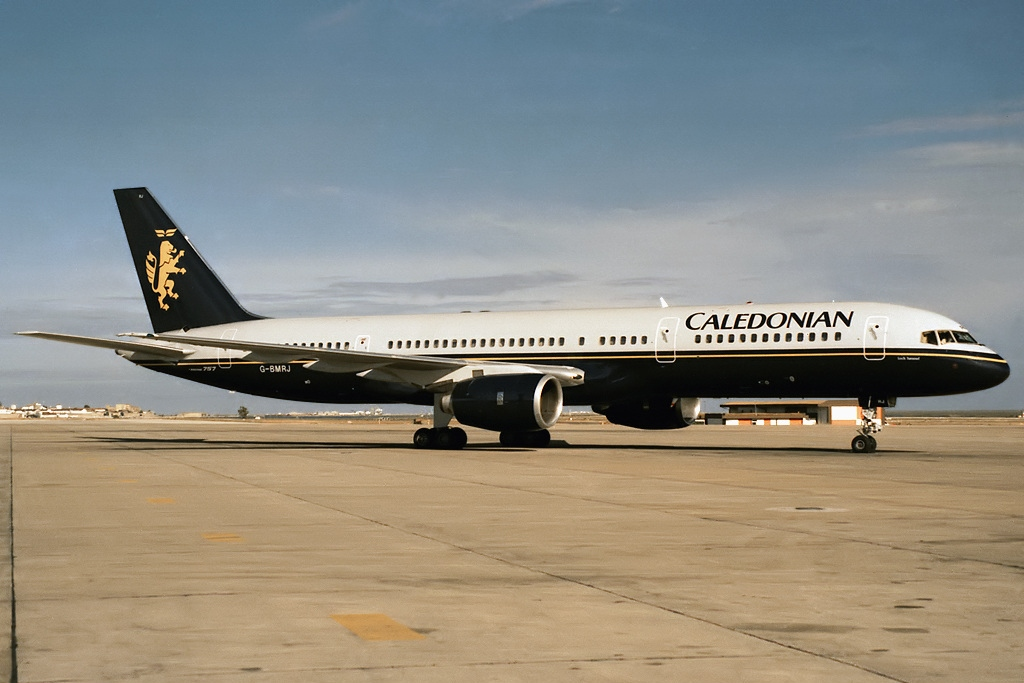
Boeing 757-200

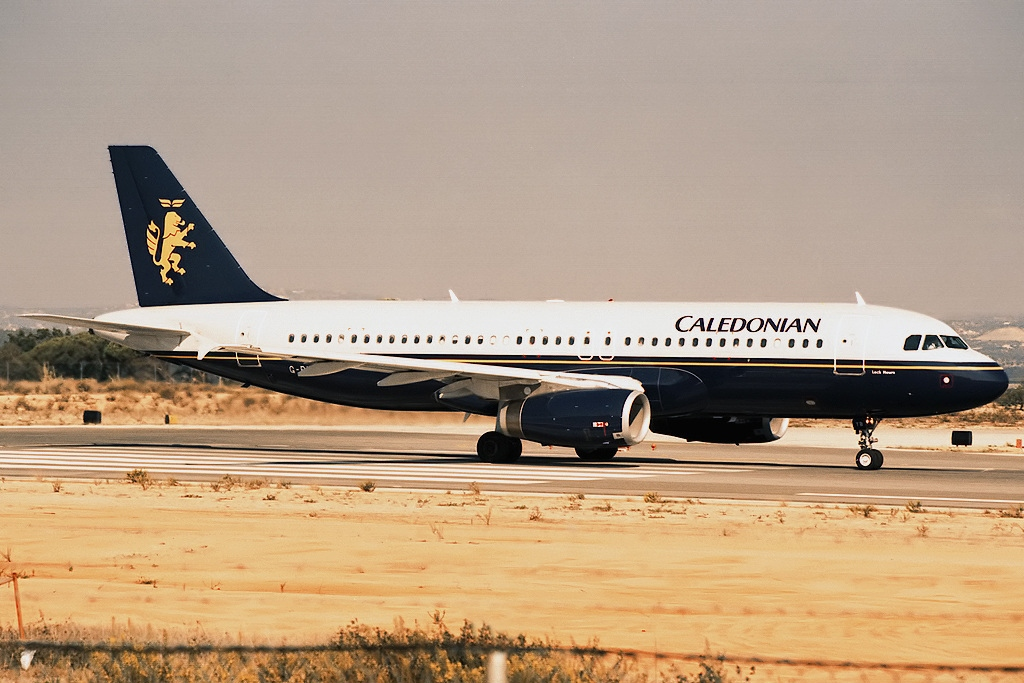
Airbus A320

Caledonian Airways operated 39 aircraft during its 12 years in operation including one leased Airbus A300, six Airbus A320, six Boeing 737-200, one Boeing 747-200, eight Boeing 757-200, ten Lockheed L-1011 and seven McDonnell Douglas DC-10.
