= Flying Colours (airline) =

Charter airline of the United Kingdom (1996–2000)

Flying Colours Airlines

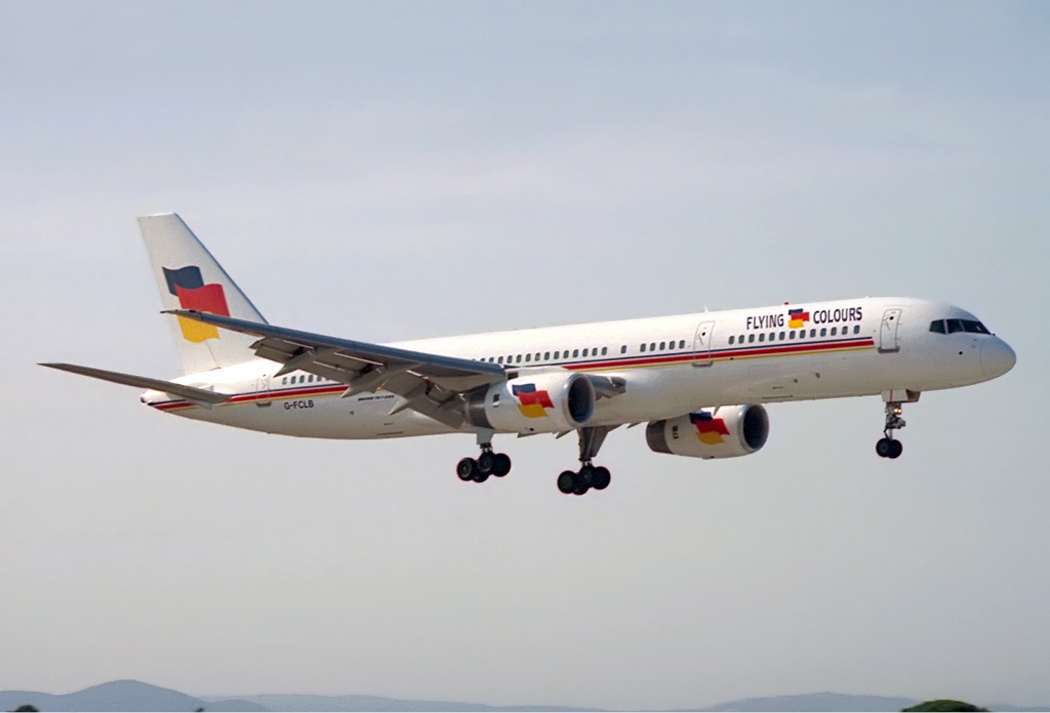
- Boeing 757-200
IATA	ICAO	Call sign
MT	FCL	COLOURS
- Founded: November 1995
- Commenced operations: 6 March 1997
- Ceased operations: 27 March 2000 (merged to form JMC Air)
- Operating bases: Glasgow; London–Gatwick; Manchester; Newcastle upon Tyne
- Headquarters: Manchester Airport

Flying Colours was a charter airline in the United Kingdom that operated from 1996 until 2000.

== History ==
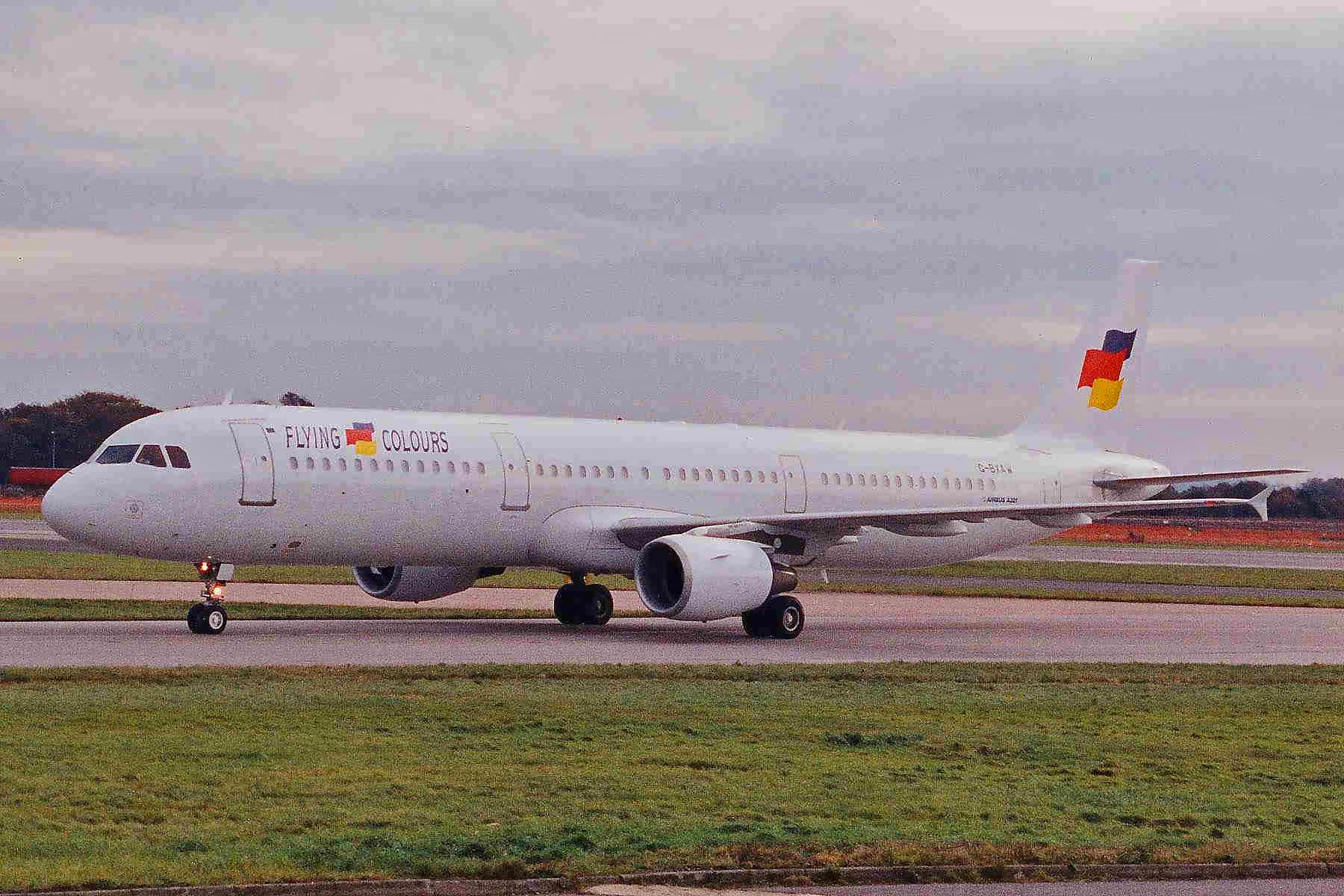
Airbus A321 at Manchester in 1998

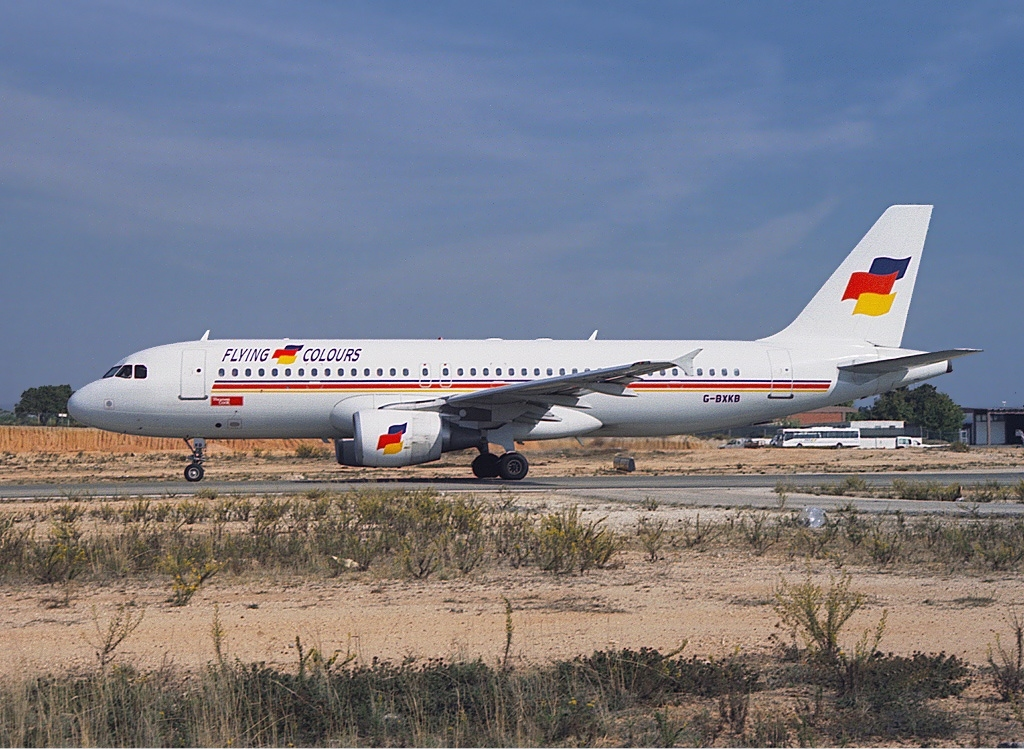
Airbus A320 in 1999

The airline was established in autumn 1996 and began unscheduled operations in March 1997 with a fleet of six Airbus A320, two Airbus A321 and eleven Boeing 757-200 aircraft. Flying Colours had several operational bases outside of its Manchester Airport headquarters, including London Gatwick Airport and Glasgow International Airport. The airline quickly established a positive reputation in the charter industry, with a fleet of newly built aircraft and new features; Flying Colours were the first airline in the UK to have LCD TV screens in the cabins of their 757s, these would fold down from the interior ceiling of the aircraft.

In 1998, Sunworld, a Thomas Cook & Son subsidiary, acquired Flying Colours Leisure Group. Subsequently, the in-house charter airline of Thomas Cook, Airworld, was integrated into Flying Colours. Shortly after the takeover two ex-Airworld Airbus A321s were returned to their lessor. The merged airline also maintained the Airworld operating base at Bristol.

In 1999 Thomas Cook completed the acquisition of Carlson Leisure Group, who operated the charter carriers Caledonian Airways and Peach Air. This led to a complete rebrand by Thomas Cook of its growing tour operation. In September 1999, Thomas Cook established it own charter airline, JMC Air, which became operational in the following month of March. Flying Colours had ordered two Airbus A330-200 aircraft to begin longhaul operations, these aircraft arrived after the JMC merger.

== See also ==
- List of defunct airlines of the United Kingdom

== Fleet ==
A Flying Colours Airlines Boeing 757-200 at Faro Airport in 1997.

The following fleet was operated by Flying Colours during its existence:

Aircraft	Total	Introduced	Retired	Notes
Airbus A320-200	6	1997	2000	Transferred to JMC Air.
Airbus A321-200	2	1998	1999	Ex-Airworld; returned to lessor.
Boeing 757-200	12	1997	2000	Transferred to JMC Air.

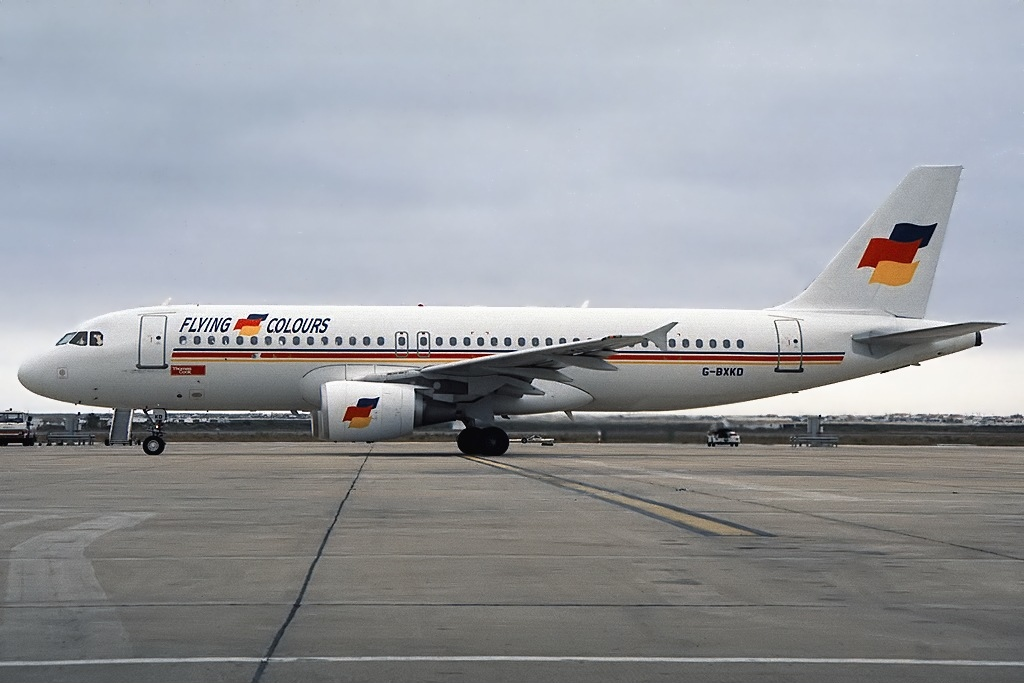
A Flying Colours Airlines Airbus A320-200 at Faro Airport in 1999.
