= JMC Air =

Charter airline of the United Kingdom (1999–2003)

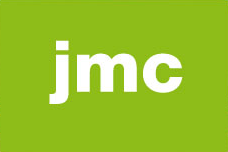

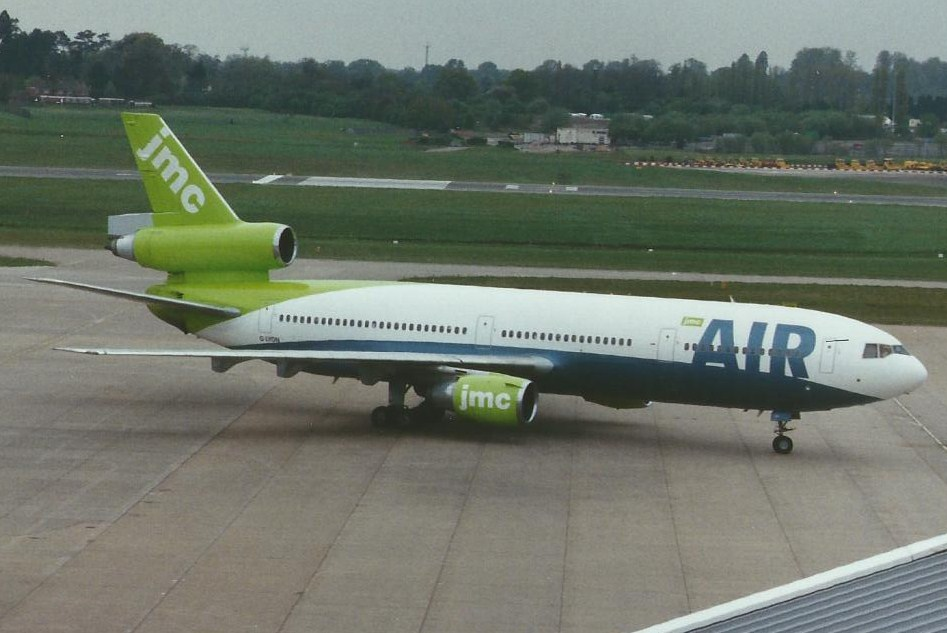
- McDonnell Douglas DC-10-30
IATA	ICAO	Call sign
MT	JMC	JMC
- Founded: 1 September 1999 (Merger of Flying Colours Airlines and Caledonian Airways)
- Commenced operations: 27 March 2000
- Ceased operations: 31 March 2003 (renamed Thomas Cook Airlines)
- Operating bases: Birmingham; Bristol; London–Gatwick; London–Stansted; Manchester; Newcastle upon Tyne
- Fleet size: 49
- Parent company: Thomas Cook AG
- Headquarters: Commonwealth House, Manchester Airport; Concorde House, Gatwick Airport
- Revenue: £438.8million (2002)
- Profit: £4.14million (2002)
- Employees: 1,736 (2002)

JMC Airlines Limited (also known as JMC Air, JMC Airlines or simply JMC and stylised as jmc) was a charter airline in the United Kingdom formed by the merger of Caledonian Airways and Flying Colours Airlines, following the purchase of Thomas Cook & Son by the Carlson Leisure Group. JMC Air primarily served the Thomas Cook holidays brand and was rebranded in March 2003 to Thomas Cook Airlines UK.

== History ==
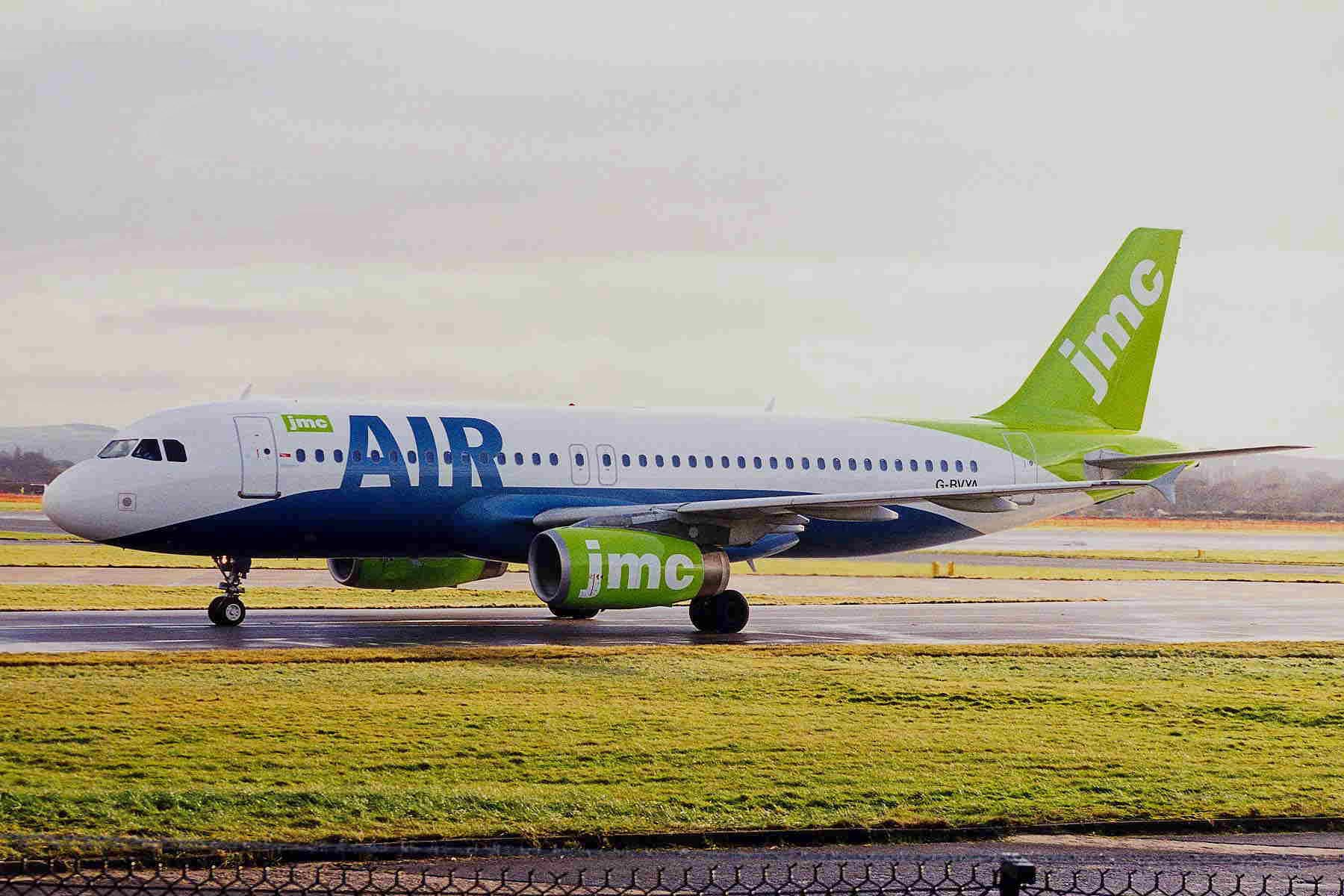
An Airbus A320-200 taxiing at Manchester Airport in 1999

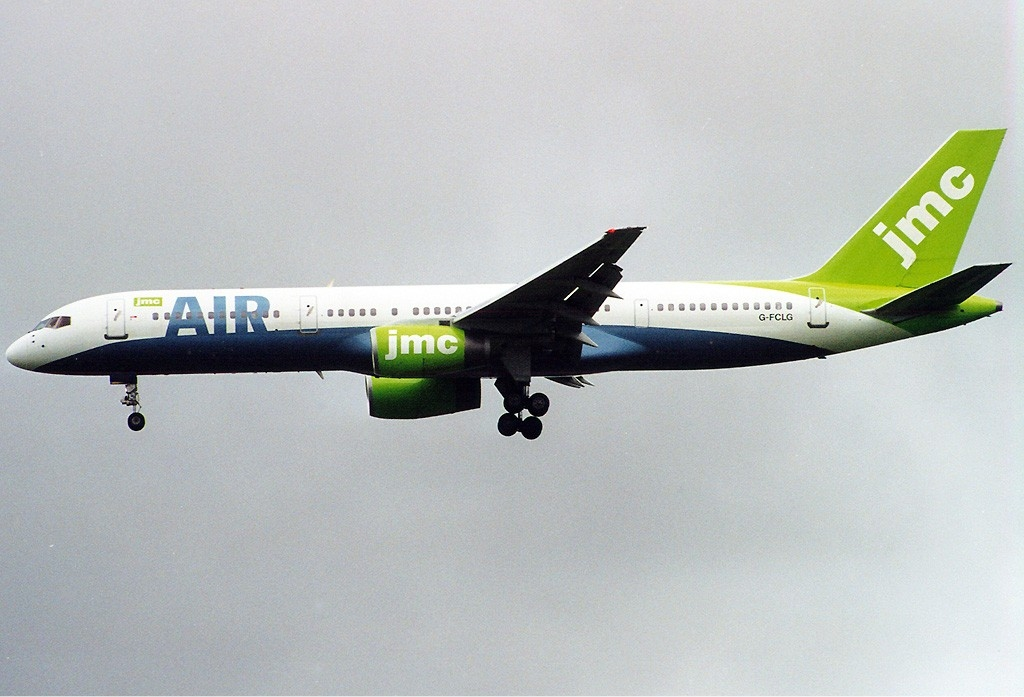
Boeing 757-200

JMC Air was initially announced in 1999, with a five year, £200m rebranding plan to join three of Thomas Cook's holiday brands Sunworld, Sunset, Inspirations and Flying Colours and Caledonian airlines. JMC Air was named after the initials of the son of Thomas Cook, John Mason Cook. JMC Air's managing director was Terry Soult who had previously served the same role with Flying Colours. It started operating under the JMC Air name from March 2000. The main operating bases were Gatwick Airport and Manchester Airport. Aircraft were also stationed at Stansted Airport, Birmingham Airport, Bristol Airport, Glasgow Airport, Cardiff Airport and Newcastle Airport. JMC Air also operated flights from Leeds Bradford Airport. At the start of operations the fleet consisted of Boeing 757-200, Airbus A320, Airbus A330-200 and McDonnell Douglas DC-10 aircraft.

In 2000, Thomas Cook was sold to C&N Touristic, a German based group backed by Lufthansa and rebranded as Thomas Cook AG. JMC Air became closely linked to Condor as a result of the acquisition, and was estimated to control 16% of all European charter airline seats. During the same year, JMC faced legal action from 20 tourists who fell ill on a package holiday in Mallorca. JMC Air were also part of an eight airline consortium that attempted to buy the British National Air Traffic Services.

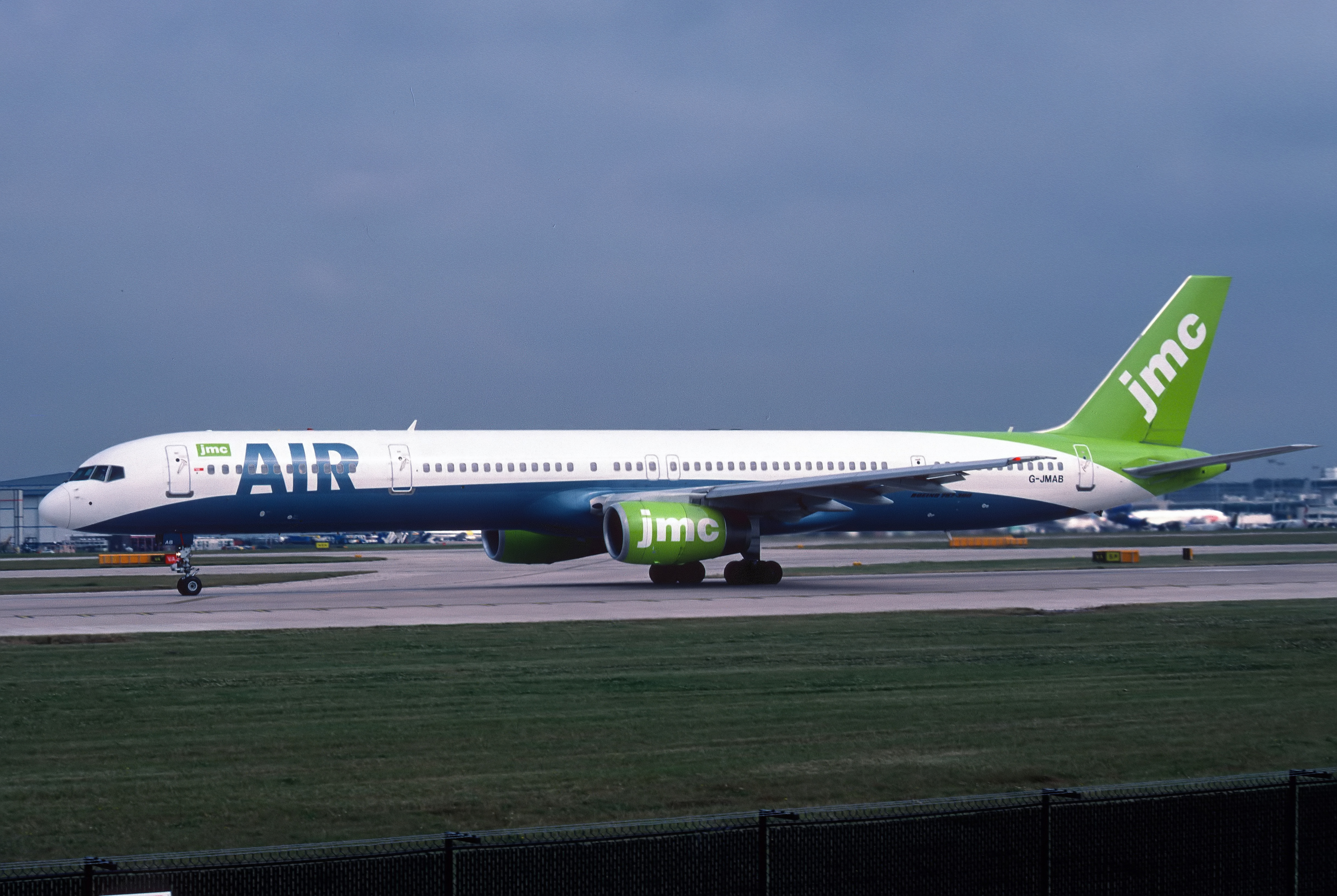
Boeing 757-300 at Manchester, 2002

Prior to launch in 1999, JMC Air sought to acquire Boeing's latest 757-300 aircraft which led to them becoming the first UK operator of the -300 in 2001. By late 2001, Thomas Cook made over 550 staff redundant of which 100 were with JMC Air. JMC Air also closed three bases in the UK, as a result of lower passenger numbers in the wake of the September 11 attacks. In November of the same year, a JMC Air flight from Newcastle to Tenerife was diverted due to a drunk passenger incident, which led to the passenger being arrested and jailed for four months. In the same month, JMC Air took delivery of two leased Airbus A330-200 aircraft via CIT Aerospace and Tyco Capital. The aircraft were configured in a two class layout and powered by Rolls-Royce Trent engines. The aircraft were primarily used for long-haul operations to the Caribbean and United States.

In early 2002, a JMC Air passenger successfully won damages for suspected deep vein thrombosis as a result of a long-haul flight from Calgary to Manchester. In May, it was announced JMC Air would be rebranded as Thomas Cook for summer 2003. Around this time, JMC were considering a move to offer flight only bookings to compete with no-frills carriers such as Easyjet. The first Thomas Cook liveried aircraft took to the skies in late 2002.

In 2003, JMC Air was noted as the best UK charter airline for shortest delays by Holiday Which, having taken an average 33 minute delay in 2001 down to an average of 13 minutes in 2002. In the same year, Sufyan Sadiq, a 16 year old travelling with Stamford College was denied boarding of a JMC Air flight from Gatwick Airport after joking with staff that he had a gun in his luggage. JMC Air concluded operations on 1 March 2003, becoming Thomas Cook Airlines whilst JMC was retained as a family holiday brand under the Cook's package holiday umbrella.

== Fleet ==
JMC Air's final and historical fleet prior to become as Thomas Cook Airlines in March 2003.

=== Final fleet ===
Aircraft type	Service	Passengers
Airbus A320-200	5	180
Airbus A330-200	1	354
Boeing 757-200	13	235
Boeing 757-300	2	280
Total	21	

== In popular culture ==
In 2001, JMC engaged in an advertising campaign for better air health with popular television fitness expert Mr Motivator. A JMC Air female cabin crew uniform from 2003 is part of a collection with the Science Museum in London.

== See also ==
- List of defunct airlines of the United Kingdom
