= Thomas Cook (disambiguation) =

Thomas Cook (1808–1892) was an English businessman and founder of the Thomas Cook & Son and Thomas Cook India.

Thomas Cook, alternatively referred to as Tommy Cook or Tom Cook, may also refer to:

== Companies/Businesses ==
- Thomas Cook & Son, an English transportation company founded by Thomas Cook and the original Thomas Cook company which operated from 1841 to 2001
- Thomas Cook AG, an English travel and tours conglomerate and the first successor to Thomas Cook & Son which merged with MyTravel plc in 2007 to form the Thomas Cook Group
- Thomas Cook Group, an English global travel company and the second successor to Thomas Cook & Son which operated from 2007 to 2019
  - Thomas Cook Group Airlines, the holding company for airline subsidiaries of the Thomas Cook Group
    - Thomas Cook Airlines, the primary asset of the Thomas Cook Group Airlines which operated from 2007 to 2019 and served the United Kingdom
    - Thomas Cook Airlines Belgium, the Belgian airline subsidiary of Thomas Cook Airlines
- Thomas Cook India, the former Indian subsidiary of Thomas Cook Airlines founded by Thomas Cook in 1881 and currently owned by Fairfax Financial Services since 2012
- Thomas Cook Tourism, a Chinese-owned British package holiday provider and the current Thomas Cook company which began operations in 2019
- Thomas Cook Airlines Scandinavia, the third and final former name of Sunclass Airlines, a Danish charter airline

== People ==
- Thomas Cook (bishop) (1866–1928), Anglican Bishop of Lewes
- Thomas Cook (engraver) (c. 1744 – 1818), English engraver
- Thomas Cook (Scottish politician) (1908–1952), Member of the United Kingdom Parliament for Dundee
- Thomas Cook (MP for Marlborough), Member of Parliament (MP) for Marlborough in 1399
- Thomas Cook (MP for Exeter), MP for Exeter from 1417 to 1442
- Thomas Cook (MP for North Norfolk) (1902–1970), Member of the United Kingdom Parliament for North Norfolk from 1931 to 1945
- Thomas D. Cook (born 1941), British sociologist
- Thomas H. Cook (born 1947), American crime writer
- Tommy Cook (sportsman) (1901–1950), Sussex batsman, footballer and football manager
- Tommy Cook (actor) (born 1930), American actor, producer and former child star
- Tom Cook (ice hockey) (1907–1961), Canadian ice hockey player
- T. J. Cook (Thomas Jones Cook, born 1982), American mixed martial artist and boxer
- T. S. Cook, American screenwriter and producer
