= Thomas Cook Group Airlines =

Airline division of the defunct British Thomas Cook Group

- Thomas Cook/Condor Flugdienst Logo 2013-2019
- Formerly: Thomas Cook Group Airlines Limited (2017, 2018-2019); Thomas Cook Group Airlines Plc (2017-2018)
- Type: Division; Private Limited Company
- Industry: Airline Holding Company
- Founded: 2013; 13 years ago
- Defunct: 23 September 2019; 6 years ago
- Fate: Ceased trading and entered into compulsory liquidation
- Headquarters: Manchester, United Kingdom; Frankfurt, Germany
- Area served: Worldwide
- Key people: Christoph Debus (Chief Airlines Officer); Manu Larose (Group Airline Director)
- Services: Transport
- Revenue: ▲£3,519 million (2018)
- Members: Condor; Thomas Cook Airlines (UK); Thomas Cook Airlines Balearics; Thomas Cook Airlines Belgium; Thomas Cook Airlines Canada; Thomas Cook Airlines Scandinavia; Thomas Cook Aviation
- Parent: Thomas Cook Group
- Website: thomascookairlines.com condor.com

Thomas Cook Group Airlines Limited was an airline holding company of the defunct British Thomas Cook Group. The airlines operated as a single operating segment of the Thomas Cook Group to allow aircraft to be used when and where they were needed. There were five members of the airline division at the time of the airline's closing, consisting of Condor, Thomas Cook Airlines, Thomas Cook Airlines Balearics, Thomas Cook Airlines Scandinavia, and Thomas Cook Aviation. The airline operated with a total of 105 aircraft based in the United Kingdom, Denmark and Germany.

== History ==
In 2013 the CEO of Thomas Cook Group, Harriet Green, merged the British Thomas Cook Airlines, Danish Thomas Cook Airlines Scandinavia, German Condor, and the now-defunct Thomas Cook Airlines Belgium into one single operating segment, after the closing of Thomas Cook Airlines Canada.

The United Kingdom's Civil Aviation Authority announced on 23 September 2019 that the group had gone into liquidation. While the British subsidiary Thomas Cook Airlines ceased operations immediately, all the other remaining airline branches continued to operate.

Thomas Cook Airlines Scandinavia was bought by separate investors and rebranded on 1 November 2019 as Sunclass Airlines, Thomas Cook Airlines Balearics ceased all operations on 26 December 2019, and also Thomas Cook Aviation on 2 April 2020. As of April 2020, only Condor continues to operate.

== Airlines ==
The following airlines were part of, or previously part of, the division until its demise in September 2019. The airlines that remained active past the demise continued operations separately from the division.

Airline	Country	Joined Thomas Cook	Description
Condor	Germany	2001	Condor is a German leisure carrier that operates a mixed fleet of both Boeing and Airbus aircraft.
Thomas Cook Airlines (UK)	United Kingdom	2001 (as JMC Air)	Thomas Cook Airlines was established in 2001 and began operating in 2003, after being renamed from the former JMC Air. The airline operated the Airbus A321-200 and Airbus A330-200. It went defunct when Thomas Cook Group filed for insolvency in 2019.
Thomas Cook Airlines Balearics	Spain	2017	Thomas Cook Airlines Balearics was a Spanish airline that was established in 2017, following the cessation of Thomas Cook Airlines Belgium. It operated the Airbus A320-200. The airline ceased all operations on 26 December 2019.
Thomas Cook Airlines Belgium	Belgium	2001 – 2017	Thomas Cook Airlines Belgium originally joined Thomas Cook AG in 2001, before being sold to Lufthansa and subsequently ceasing operations and exiting the division in 2017.
Thomas Cook Airlines Scandinavia	Denmark	2007 (as MyTravel A/S)	Thomas Cook Airlines Scandinavia was a Scandinavian airline that operated flights from Denmark, Norway, Sweden and Finland to worldwide destinations. In October 2019, its parent company was acquired by an investment consortium and the airline was rebranded as Sunclass Airlines. The airline operates the Airbus A321-200, Airbus A330-200, and Airbus A330-300.
Thomas Cook Aviation	Germany	2018	Thomas Cook Aviation was established in 2018 as "Air Berlin Aviation GmbH" and later renamed. The airline operated Airbus A321-200 aircraft for Condor in Düsseldorf and Leipzig. It filed for bankruptcy on 2 April 2020.
