= Frank Meysman =

Businessperson

- Born: 6 April 1952 (age 74); Belgium
- Occupations: Businessman; chairman
- Years active: 1977–1986; 2011–2019
- Employer: Thomas Cook Group
- Known for: Thomas Cook Group Airlines
- Title: chairman of Thomas Cook
- Term: 1 October 2011 – September 2019
- Predecessor: Thomas Cook Group Board
- Successor: Vacant
- Political party: Christen-Democratisch

Thomas Cook Group

Chairman
- In office 1 October 2011 – 23 September 2019
- Preceded by: board of directors
- Succeeded by: Collapsed

chairman, Procter & Gamble
- In office 1977–1986
- Preceded by: see Procter & Gamble
- Succeeded by: David S. Taylor
- Website: www.thomascookgroup.com

François Louis Virginie Meysman (born 6 April 1952) is a businessman best known for being the Chairman of Thomas Cook Group at the time of its collapse.

== Early life ==
He was born in Brussels, Belgium. He trained at the Vlekho in Brussels. He also has a degree from the Vlerick Leuven Gent Management School which is part of Ghent University.

== Career ==
From 1977 to 1986 he worked for Procter & Gamble. From 1986 to 1990 he worked for Douwe Egberts, the Dutch coffee brand, as deputy Marketing Director, later becoming its Marketing Director.

From 17 May 2006 until 9 November 2011 he was Chairman of the Supervisory Board of the Dutch engineering consultancy Grontmij. From 2003–5 he was the Chief Executive of the Conseil de la Publicité (Raad voor de Reclame – the Belgian Advertising Standards Board). From 1 October 2007 he was Chairman of the Supervisory Board of the Dutch company Corporate Express. He was also a Director of the private equity company GIMV (Gewestelijke Investerings Maatschappij voor Vlaanderen), the magazine publisher Verenigde Nederlandse Uitgeverijen (VNU), and the textile company Picanol since 18 April 2005.

=== Thomas Cook ===
He took over as Chairman of Thomas Cook Group on 1 December 2011. He had been chairman Designate since 1 October 2011.

In an interview for The Report on BBC Radio 4 on 9 February 2012 he said that company executives should lose their pay if the company underperforms, by performance targets. He said that shareholders were the wrong people to control company pay.

== Personal life ==
He lives in Merchtem in Flemish Brabant. He is a supporter of the Christen-Democratisch en Vlaams (CD & V) party.

Business positions
Preceded by Thomas Cook Board	Chairman of Thomas Cook Group; 2011–2019	Succeeded by Collapsed
Preceded by Thomas Cook Board	Chairman of Thomas Cook Airlines; 2011–2019	Succeeded by Collapsed
