= Inter European Airways =

British charter airline

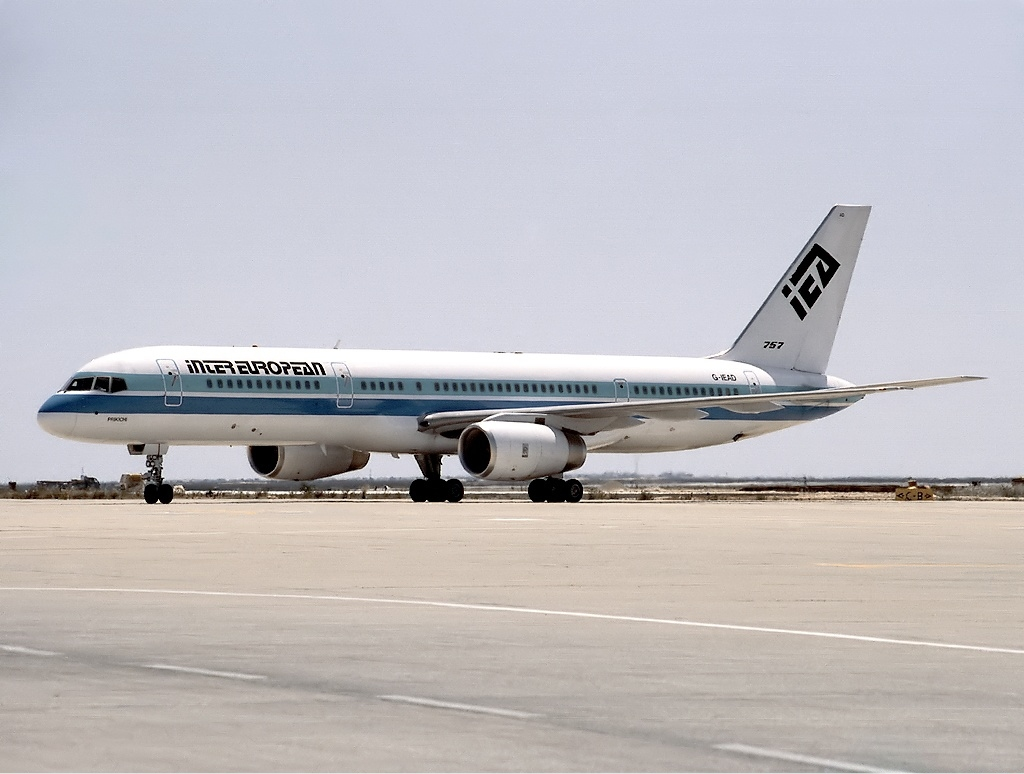
- Boeing 757
IATA	ICAO	Call sign
IP	IEA	ASPRO
- Founded: March 1986
- Commenced operations: May 1987
- Ceased operations: November 1993 (merged into Airtours Int.)
- Operating bases: Cardiff Airport
- Fleet size: 12
- Destinations: Europe
- Parent company: Aspro Travel
- Headquarters: Cardiff, United Kingdom
- Key people: S Mansfield; Michael Georgiou Asprou

Inter European Airways was a charter airline based in Cardiff, Wales.

== History ==
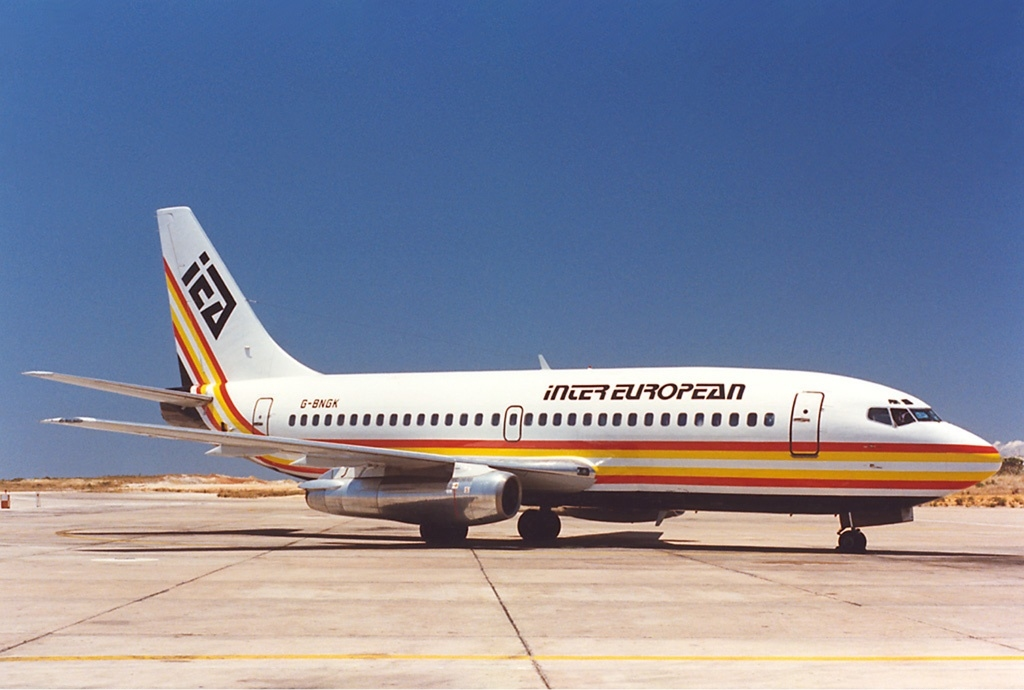
Boeing 737-200

Inter European Airway Ltd. commenced operation in May 1987. Initial plans had indicated the use of two Boeing 737-300 aircraft, but in place of these a single 737-200 leased from GPA was used.

After operating during the Summer 1987 season, the aircraft was returned to GPA at the end of October and operations ceased for the winter.

Two new Boeing 737-300 series aircraft were however delivered in early 1988 – these too being leased from GPA.

Over the subsequent years, the IEA fleet grew to a total of 12 aircraft, though the maximum operated at any time was 8 aircraft during 1992 & 1993.

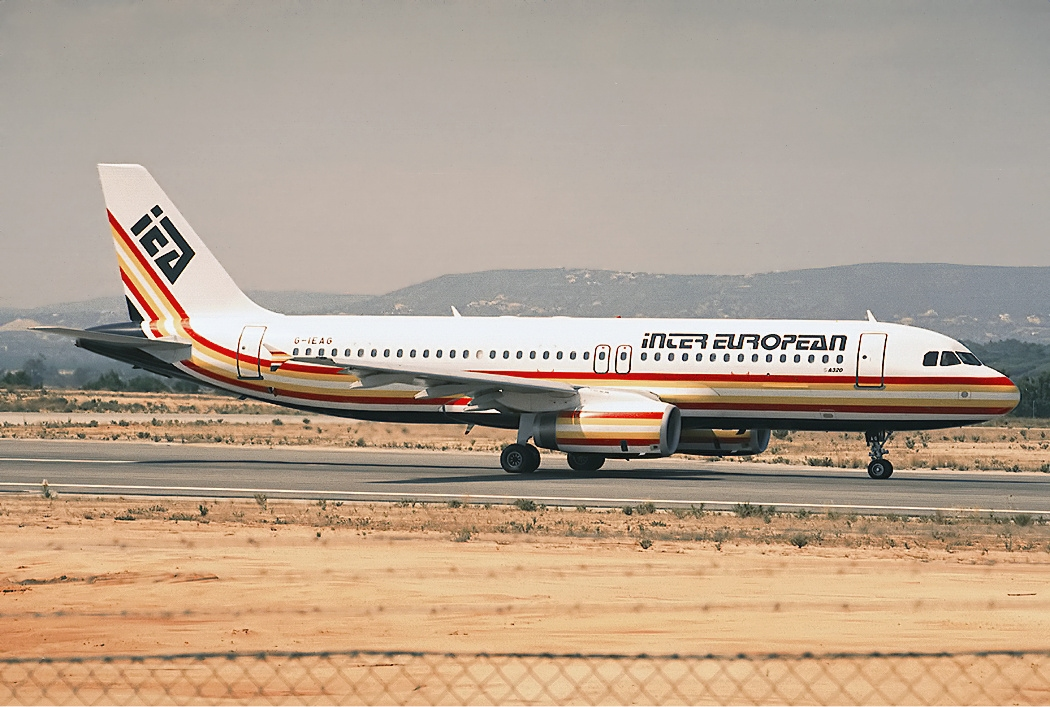
IAirbus A320

Other aircraft operated included the Boeing 737-400, Boeing 757-200 and Airbus A320-200.

In June 1993 parent company Aspro Travel was acquired by the Airtours Group for £20m.

Operations under the IEA name continued to the end of October 1993.

The Inter European Airways fleet was then either disposed of (Boeing 737-300/400 aircraft) or merged into the Airtours International fleet and repainted into their livery.

== Fleet ==
Inter European operated 12 narrow-body aircraft during its seven years of operation consisting of four Boeing 757s, six Boeing 737s and two Airbus A320s.

== See also ==
- List of defunct airlines of the United Kingdom
