= TCGA =

TCGA may refer to:

- The Cancer Genome Atlas
- The Center for Genetic Anthropology at University College London
- Taxation of Chargeable Gains Act 1992
- Thomas Cook Group Airlines Limited - entered compulsory liquidation 23 September 2019
