= The Cotswold School =

Location
- The Avenue; Bourton-on-the-Water, Gloucestershire, GL54 2BD; United Kingdom; 51°53′19″N 1°45′31″W

Information
- Other name: The Cotswold Academy
- Type: Academy
- Motto: Friendship – Knowledge
- Established: 1988
- Department for Education URN: 136292 Tables
- Ofsted: Reports
- Head teacher: Will Morgan
- Staff: 180
- Gender: Coeducational
- Age: 11 to 18
- Enrolment: 1,506
- Houses: Poseidon; Artemis; Zeus; Apollo
- Colours: Blue and yellow
- Website: www.cotswold.gloucs.sch.uk

Cotswold School is an 11 to 18 academy school located in Bourton-on-the-Water, Gloucestershire, Great Britain. The school achieved academy status in September 2010. The principal from 2012 is Mr Will Morgan. In 2023, the school had 1430 students (with approximately 290 of those students in the sixth form).

In November 2022, The Cotswold School was named The Sunday Times Southwest Comprehensive School of the Year 2023, ranked by their examination results from 2021/2022.

== History ==
The Cotswold School opened in 1988 following the amalgamation of Bourton Vale Secondary Modern (in Bourton on the Water) and Westwood's Grammar School (Northleach). The first head teacher was Mr Sanders and first chair of governors was Mavis, Viscountess Dunrossil. The roll was just over 400 students and 35 staff.

Former head teachers were Mr Sanders (September 1988 – August 1995) and Mrs Holland (September 1995 – December 2011).

== Today ==
The school roll in March 2025 stands at 1506 students and 140 staff. The last 30 years have seen an extensive programme of building. In the last 5 years, a new Sixth Form study suite and common room have been built; refurbished and newly equipped science laboratories; a gymnasium extension to the sports hall; and a 2 storey, 10 classroom English block with communal learning space, study rooms and department office, which was opened in 2020.

The school gained specialisms for languages (2002) and science (2006) as part of the now defunct specialist schools programme.

The extension to the sixth form and science blocks was opened by Nigel Twiston-Davies in April 2009. The new £1.5 million sports hall, with changing rooms and a community room alongside, first opened in November 2009; it was opened by the former England cricket captain Mike Gatting in July 2010.

The mathematics block was opened by Geoffrey Clinton-brown and Mavis, Viscountess Dunrossil as part of the school's 25th anniversary celebrations during the academic year 2013/2014.

The Sixth Form study suite was opened by Adam Henson Henson in March 2018. The English block was opened by Emma and Simon Keswick November 2022.

During the building of the extensions, it was discovered that the school is situated on a Roman cemetery which was found to also contain Iron Age graves.

== Ofsted reports and accolades ==
In March 2025, Ofsted judged The Cotswold School 'Outstanding' across all categories. This was the fifth consecutive 'Outstanding' inspection carried out at the school.

- An ‘Outstanding’ 11–18 School, Ofsted 2002, 2006, 2009, 2015 and 2025.
- National Teaching School, designated by the National College of Teaching and Leadership 2016.
- The Sunday Times Parent Power Schools Guide 2023 Southwest Comprehensive of the Year.

== Alumni ==
=== Westwood's Grammar School ===
- Harriet Green OBE, chief executive from 2012 to 2014 of Thomas Cook Group
- Wilf Paish MBE, athletics coach

=== The Cotswold School ===
- Alice Powell, racing driver
- Sam Twiston-Davies, jockey
- Kieran Shoemark, jockey
