= Harriet Green =

British businesswoman (born 1961)

- Born: 12 December 1961 (age 64); Cheltenham, Gloucestershire, England
- Education: Westwood's Grammar School; King's College London
- Occupation: Businesswoman
- Years active: 1985–present
- Title: Chairman & CEO, IBM Asia Pacific; CEO, Thomas Cook Group (2012–2014); CEO, Premier Farnell (2006–2012)
- Board member of: BAE Systems
- Spouse: Graham Clarkson
- Children: 2

Harriet Green OBE (born 12 December 1961) is a British businesswoman, who was chairman and CEO of IBM Asia Pacific, and previously led three IBM business divisions: the Internet of things, customer engagement and education businesses.

She was CEO of the Thomas Cook Group from July 2012 to November 2014.

== Early life ==
Harriet Green was born on 12 December 1961 in Cheltenham, England to Dermot Green and Nerys Allen. She grew up in Shipton, Gloucestershire, east of Cheltenham, in the Cotswolds. She was educated at Westwood's Grammar School in Northleach.

She studied medieval history at King's College London, graduating with a bachelor's degree in 1983. She then studied Business Psychology at the London School of Economics, graduating in 1985.

== Career ==
Green spent her early career in the electronic components industry, working in Europe, the United States and Asia. She was managing director of Macro Group, and then appointed president of the Asia/Pacific sector of Arrow Electronics from 2002 to 2006. She was chief executive officer of Premier Farnell, a global electronics distribution business, from 2006 until 2012.

She became CEO of Thomas Cook Group on 30 July 2012, succeeding Manny Fontenla-Novoa who was CEO from 2003. She obtained this position by cold calling chairman Frank Meysman. During her time as CEO, Green helped grow Thomas Cook Group's market worth from £148m to more than £2bn and helped increase the company's share price 829pc.

In November 2014, it was announced that Green was leaving with immediate effect, and that Peter Fankhauser, the COO would take over as CEO. Following the announcement of Green's departure, the company's share value dropped by more than £350m. Despite the deaths of Christianne and Robert Shepherd occurring in 2006 before she was appointed, Green announced in June 2015 that she was donating a third of her £5.7m Thomas Cook bonus, £1.9m, to a charity chosen by the parents of two children who died while on holiday. The Group was highly criticised by the coroner in the 2015 inquest – which ruled the pair were unlawfully killed from carbon monoxide poisoning in Corfu in 2006 – for its treatment of the family, which included the period of Green's tenure.

In October 2019, the Parliamentary Select Committee hearing and report had no negative input on her tenure as CEO and stated that Thomas Cook's recovery may have continued had she been allowed to complete the transformation she started.

IBM appointed Green as the head of the IBM Watson Internet of Things business unit in December 2015. The company is based in Armonk, NY. As the general manager of Watson Customer Engagement, Watson Internet of Things and Education at IBM, Green was responsible for driving innovation-led growth, according to IBM.

Green completed her nine-year non-executive director tenure of BAE Systems. She was listed for three consecutive years since 2017 on the "HERoes Women Role Model List - Champions of Women in Business".

In 2016, Green won the Women in Technology Institute award, and was inducted into the Women in Technology Hall of Fame.

In 2017, Fast Company named Green one of the 100 Most Creative People in Business for her work alerting businesses to power and potential of IBM Watson.

In February 2019, Green was appointed as a board member to the Singapore Economic Development Board (EDB) and completed her term in January 2021.

In September 2019, she was listed #30 on Fortune's Most Powerful Women International List. In 2019, she was recognised by LinkedIn as a LinkedIn Influencer, and in 2020 she was announced as a LinkedIn Top Voice.

Since 2015, Green has sat on the Kings Business School Advisory Board, and in 2020 was named executive chair of Mission Beyond.

== Personal life ==
She lives in Summertown, Oxford. She married Graham Clarkson in 2004 in Oxfordshire, and the couple have two adult children.

Green received an OBE in the 2010 Birthday Honours. She is a devotee of hatha yoga and reads several books a week, claiming that indulging in literature delivers an escape and relaxation away from business. Green has previously claimed that she only sleeps for around four hours a day. In February 2013, she was assessed as one of the 100 most powerful women in the United Kingdom by Woman's Hour on BBC Radio 4.

Business positions
| Preceded by Sam Weihagen | Chief Executive of Thomas Cook Group; July 2012 – November 2014 | Succeeded by Peter Fankhauser |
