= Thomas Cook Airlines =

Charter and scheduled airline of the United Kingdom (2003–2019)

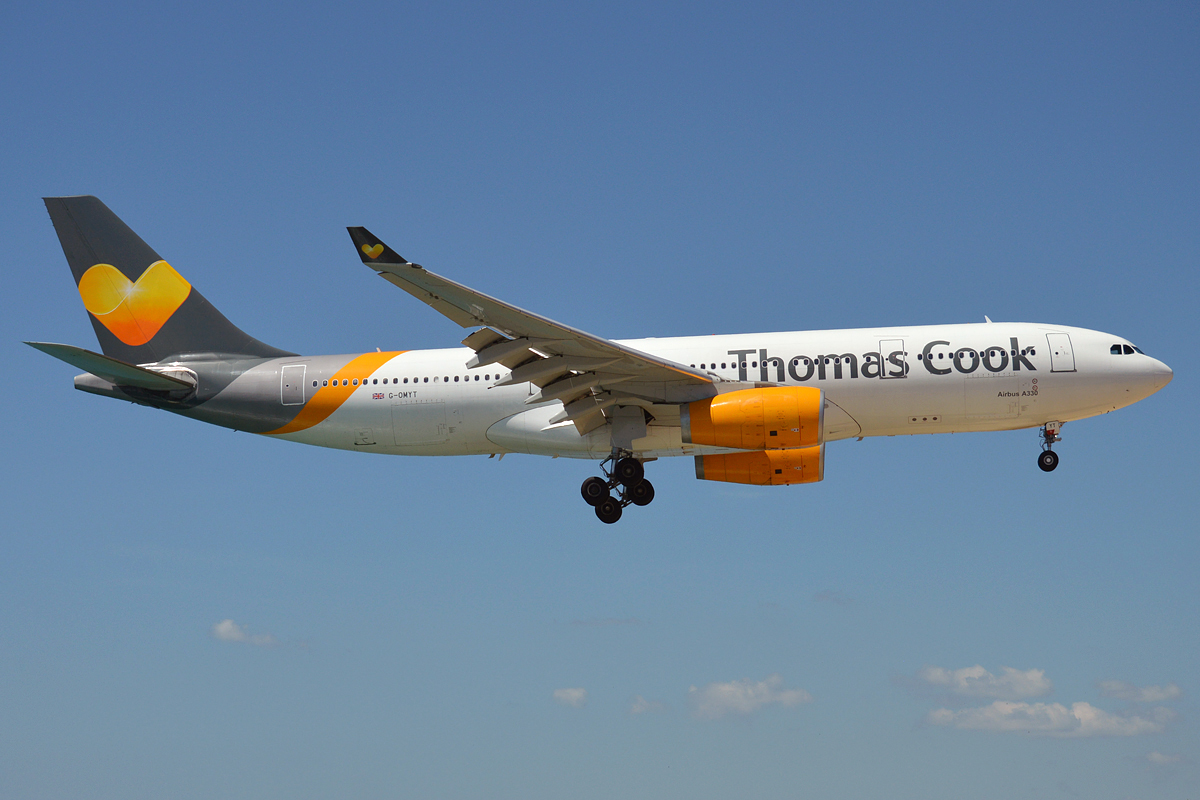
- Airbus A330-200
IATA	ICAO	Call sign
MT	TCX	THOMAS COOK
- Founded: 1 September 1999 (as JMC Air)
- Commenced operations: 31 March 2003 (as Thomas Cook Airlines)
- Ceased operations: 23 September 2019 (as Thomas Cook Airlines)
- AOC #: 549
- Operating bases: Belfast–International; Birmingham; Bristol; Cardiff; East Midlands; Glasgow; London–Gatwick; London–Stansted; Manchester; Newcastle upon Tyne
- Destinations: 82 (at demise)
- Parent company: Thomas Cook Group
- Headquarters: Manchester, England
- Key people: Peter Fankhauser (CEO); Christoph Debus (managing director)
- Net income: £103.06 million (2018)

Thomas Cook Airlines Ltd. was a British charter and scheduled airline headquartered in Manchester, England. It was founded in 2007 from the merger of Thomas Cook Group and MyTravel Group, and was part of the Thomas Cook Group Airlines. It served leisure destinations worldwide from its main bases at Manchester Airport and Gatwick Airport on a scheduled and charter basis. It also operated services from eight other airports around the United Kingdom. Thomas Cook Group and all UK entities including Thomas Cook Airlines entered compulsory liquidation on 23 September 2019.

== History ==
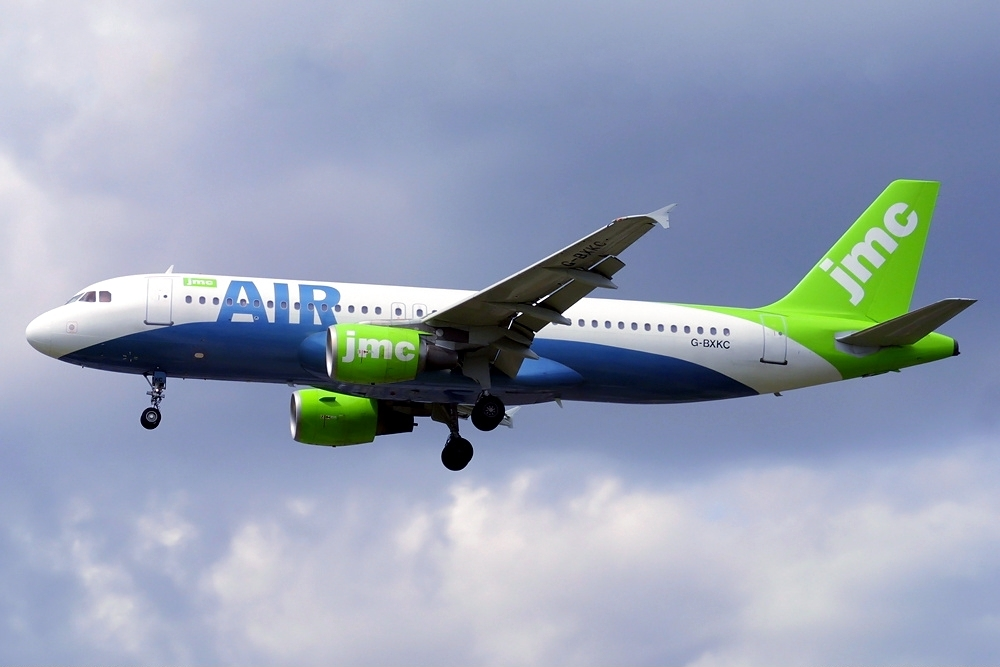
Airbus A320-200, 2002

=== Four mergers ===
The airline origins go back to 1 September 1999 when JMC Air Ltd. was created through the merger of Flying Colours Airlines and Caledonian Airways following the purchase of Thomas Cook & Son by the Carlson Leisure Group. It started operations on 27 March 2000, operating flights from 6 airports in the UK, offering seat-only bookings and bookings via Thomas Cook Tour Operations. In 2001, the airline became the first UK operator of the stretched Boeing 757-300. In April 2003, Thomas Cook AG rebranded its airlines under the Thomas Cook name.

In June 2007, following the merger between Thomas Cook AG and MyTravel Group to form Thomas Cook Group, on 30 March 2008, MyTravel Airways was merged into Thomas Cook Airlines.

=== Thomas Cook brand ===
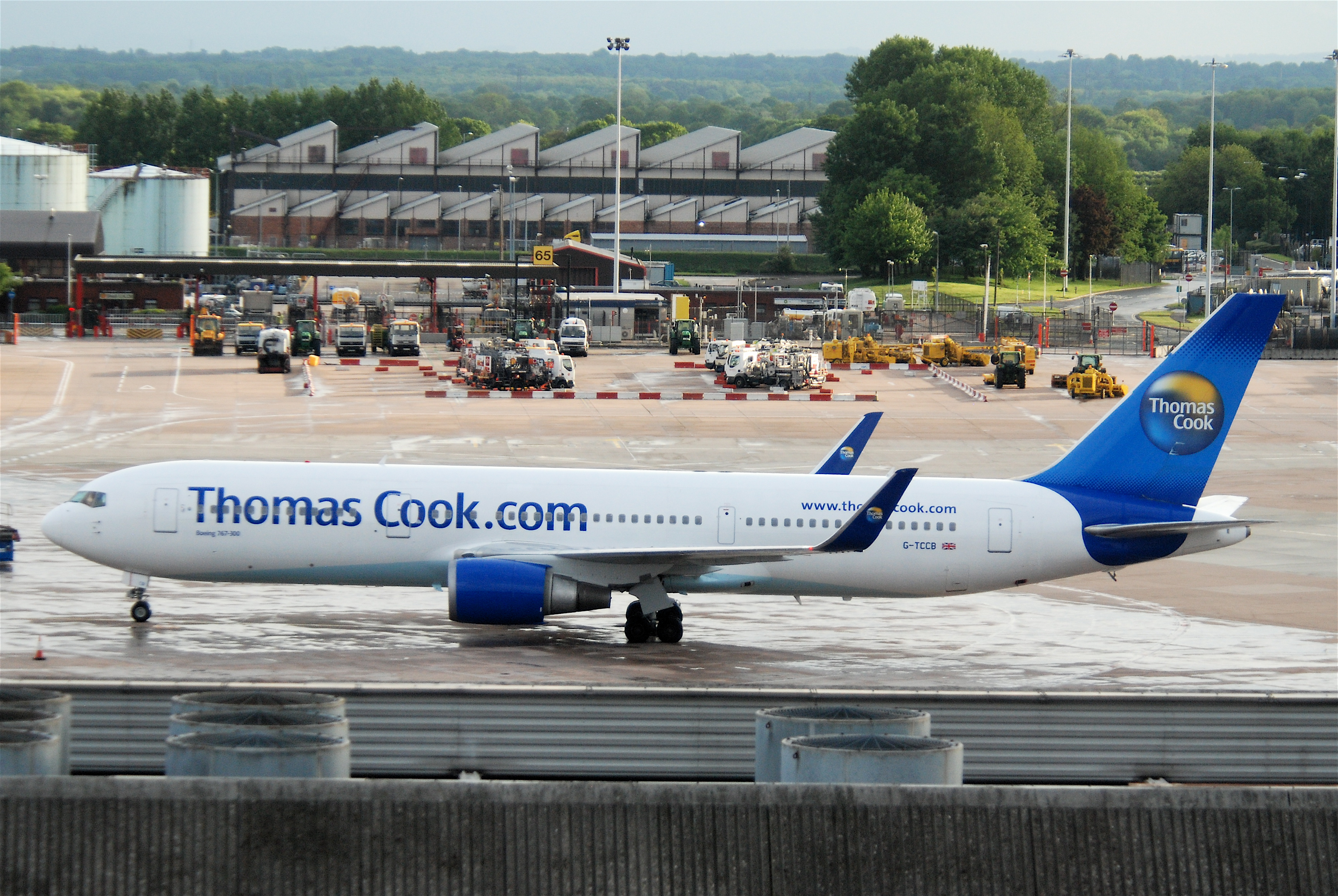
A Boeing 767-300ER at Manchester Airport in 2011

In 2013, Thomas Cook Airlines, Thomas Cook Airlines Belgium, Thomas Cook Airlines Scandinavia and Condor merged into a single operating segment of a group named the Thomas Cook Group Airlines. Thomas Cook Airlines carried around 6.4 million passengers during 2015, a six per cent increase compared with 2014.

=== Collapse ===
The airline fell into liquidation on 23 September 2019. Airlines around the world took part in ferrying stranded passengers back to the UK, using their aircraft. The repatriation effort covered 165,000 passengers, the largest in UK history, and 65,000 more passengers than the collapse of Monarch Airlines in 2017. The last flight to depart was MT2643, an (Airbus A330-243) from Orlando to Manchester. The airline's AOC was revoked on 7 November 2019.

== Corporate affairs ==
=== Overview ===
Thomas Cook Airlines was part of the airline division of the Thomas Cook Group, which consisted of three more sister airlines, all of which had a joint fleet management: Thomas Cook Airlines Scandinavia, German-based Condor and Thomas Cook Airlines Balearics. The airline held a United Kingdom Civil Aviation Authority Type A Operating Licence, permitting it to carry passengers, cargo and mail on aircraft with 20 or more seats.

=== Profits ===
Thomas Cook Airlines Ltd. - Corporate Affairs
Year	Net Income	CEO
2010	£21.418 million	Manny Fontenla-Novoa
2011	£32.03 million	Manny Fontenla-Novoa; Harriet Green
2012	£54.61 million	Harriet Green
2013	£77.218 million	Harriet Green
2014	£24.878 million	Harriet Green; Peter Fankhauser
2015	£85.347 million	Peter Fankhauser
2016	£171.952 million	Peter Fankhauser
2017	-(£31.109) million	Peter Fankhauser
2018	£103.061 million	Peter Fankhauser

=== Business figures ===
Year	Total passengers	Total flights	Load factor	Passenger change YoY
2005*	9,320,817	47,287	89.9%	
2006*	8,441,276	42,182	89.0%	▼9.4%
2007*	8,528,655	43,013	87.9%	▲1.0%
2008	8,315,327	42,410	90.0%	▼2.5%
2009	8,202,534	38,849	92.0%	▼1.4%
2010	8,120,815	37,571	93.1%	▼1.0%
2011	7,969,693	36,103	93.3%	▼1.9%
2012	6,783,661	32,109	94.1%	▼14.9%
2013	6,084,315	28,438	93.1%	▼10.3%
2014	6,043,480	28,858	91.4%	▼0.7%
2015	6,395,623	30,601	91.8%	▲5.8%
2016	6,623,564	32,208	89.8%	▲3.6%
2017	7,319,546	35,553	90.2%	▲10.5%
2018	8,092,208	39,512	90.5%	▲10.6%
^{* Data for 2005 to 2007 includes MyTravel Airways; Source: United Kingdom Civil Aviation Authority}

== Fleet ==
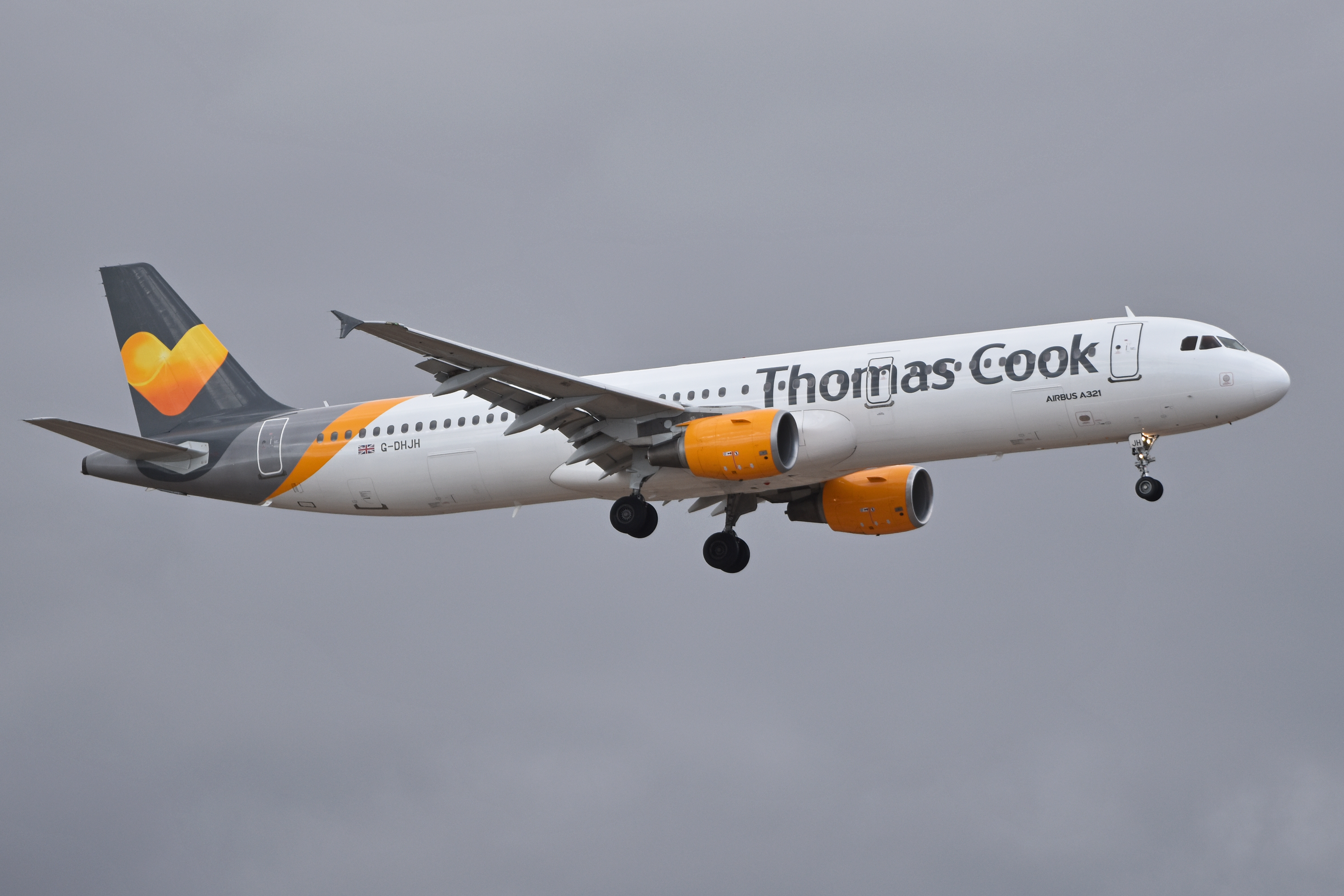
Airbus A321-200

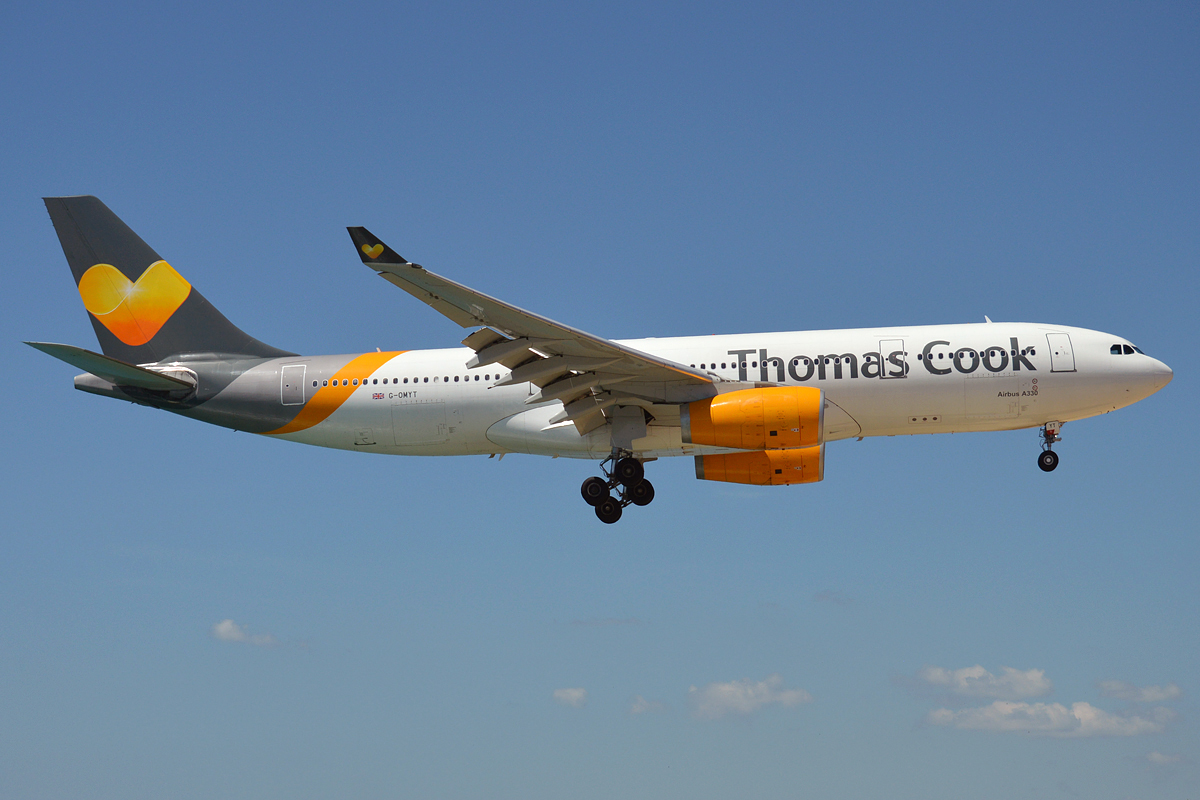
Airbus A330-200

=== Final fleet ===
At the time of cessation the fleet comprised 27 Airbus A321-200s and seven Airbus A330-200s.

=== Historical fleet ===
As JMC Air, the airline had operated the following aircraft types:

Aircraft type	Total	Introduced	Retired	Remarks
Airbus A320-200	27	2000	2011	
Airbus A320-200	12	2012	2019	Leased from SmartLynx Airlines and Avion Express
Airbus A320-200	1	2017	2018	Transferred to Thomas Cook Airlines Balearics
Boeing 757-200	21	2000	2016	Replaced by Airbus A321-200.
Boeing 757-300	5	2001	2019	Transferred to Condor.
Boeing 767-300ER	3	2010	2017	Withdrawn from use and converted to freighters for Atlas Air.
McDonnell Douglas DC-10-30	2	2000	2001	

== See also ==
- List of defunct airlines of the United Kingdom
