= Manny Fontenla-Novoa =

Spanish-British businessman (born 1954)

- Born: Manuel Fontenla Novoa; 13 May 1954 (age 71); Cuntis Galicia, Spain
- Occupation: Businessman
- Title: former CEO of the Thomas Cook Group
- Term: 2003 - August 2011
- Successor: Harriet Green
- Children: 4

Manny Fontenla-Novoa (born 13 May 1954) is a Spanish-British businessman, the former chief executive of Thomas Cook AG, who then merged with MyTravel Group to form Thomas Cook Group from 2003 until his resignation in August 2011. He has been president at Logitravel group since October 2018.

== Personal life ==
Born in Galicia on 13 May 1954, he moved to the United Kingdom at the age of 11.

== Career ==
Fontenla-Novoa started his career with Thomas Cook in the printing department in 1972 and held a variety of roles until he joined International Leisure Group in 1988. After International Leisure Group collapsed, Fontenla-Novoa co-founded the tour operator Sunworld in 1991. He rejoined Thomas Cook after its acquisition of Sunworld in 1996, and was its chief executive from 2003 to 2011.

Fontenla-Novoa was also a director of Iberostar, a Spanish hotel chain.
