= Tjäreborg =

Finnish travel agency and tour operator

Oy Tjäreborg Ab
- Company type: Private
- Industry: Travel and Tourism
- Founded: 1966
- Parent: Nordic Leisure Travel Group

Oy Tjäreborg Ab is a Finnish travel agency and tour operator. Established in 1966, it had in 2016 approximately 23% share (by number of travellers) of the Finnish package holiday market.

The owner of Tjäreborg, the Thomas Cook Group plc went into compulsory liquidation on 23 September 2019. Thomas Cook operations in Finland continue with the help of a loan from the Norwegian government.
