= MyTravel Airways =

Charter airline of the United Kingdom (1990–2007)

Airtours International Airways Limited MyTravel Airways Limited
IATA	ICAO	Call sign
VZ (1990–2007)	AIH (1990–2002); MYT (2002–2007)	KESTRAL (1990–2002); KESTREL (2002–2007)
- Founded: 1 October 1990 (as Airtours International Airways)
- Commenced operations: 11 March 1991 (as Airtours International Airways); 1 May 2002 (as MyTravel Airways)
- Ceased operations: 1 May 2002 (as Airtours International Airways); 21 November 2007 (as MyTravel Airways; merged into Thomas Cook Airlines UK)
- Operating bases: Belfast–International; Birmingham; Bristol; Cardiff; East Midlands; Glasgow; London–Gatwick; Liverpool; Manchester; Newcastle upon Tyne
- Subsidiaries: MyTravel Airways A/S
- Parent company: MyTravel Group (1990–2007); Thomas Cook Group (2007–2008)
- Headquarters: Manchester, England
- Key people: Frank Pullman (managing director); Steve Solomon (director of flight operations); Martin Mahoney (chief pilot); Lucas Mollan (technical director and managing director of MTAE)

MyTravel Airways was a British scheduled and charter airline with headquarters in Manchester, England. It operated worldwide holiday charter services mainly for its parent company, the MyTravel Group. The airline merged with Thomas Cook Airlines UK Limited in 2008 and was renamed Thomas Cook Airlines Limited.

The airline was founded in 1990 as Airtours International Airways and was to be the in-house airline for Airtours Holidays, (Going Places Travel Agent). In 1993 they purchased Inter European Airways and the fleet was merged. In 2002 Airtours changed their brand name to MyTravel and therefore Airtours International Airways became MyTravel Airways. During 2007 the MyTravel Group agreed to merge with Thomas Cook AG, and on 30 March 2008, MyTravel Airways was fully integrated into Thomas Cook Airlines.

MyTravel Airways A/S was the Danish sister airline of MyTravel Airways, which was re-branded Thomas Cook Airlines Scandinavia on 8 May 2008.

== History ==
=== Airtours International ===
The Airtours tour operating company was founded by David Crossland and established its own in-house airline, Airtours International Airways, on 1 October 1990. It started operations on 11 March 1991 flying McDonnell Douglas MD-80 aircraft to destinations throughout Europe.

Cardiff-based Aspro Holidays and their inhouse airline, Inter European Airways, were acquired and integrated in November 1993 adding new aircraft types such as the Boeing 757 and Airbus A320 to the fleet. The MD83's were replaced in 1995–1996 with more Airbus A320s. In 1996 the parent company also acquired Danish charter airline Premiair. Airtours also had operations in Germany with airline FlyFTi, operating Airbus A320s until this was merged back into the UK fleet during 2003.

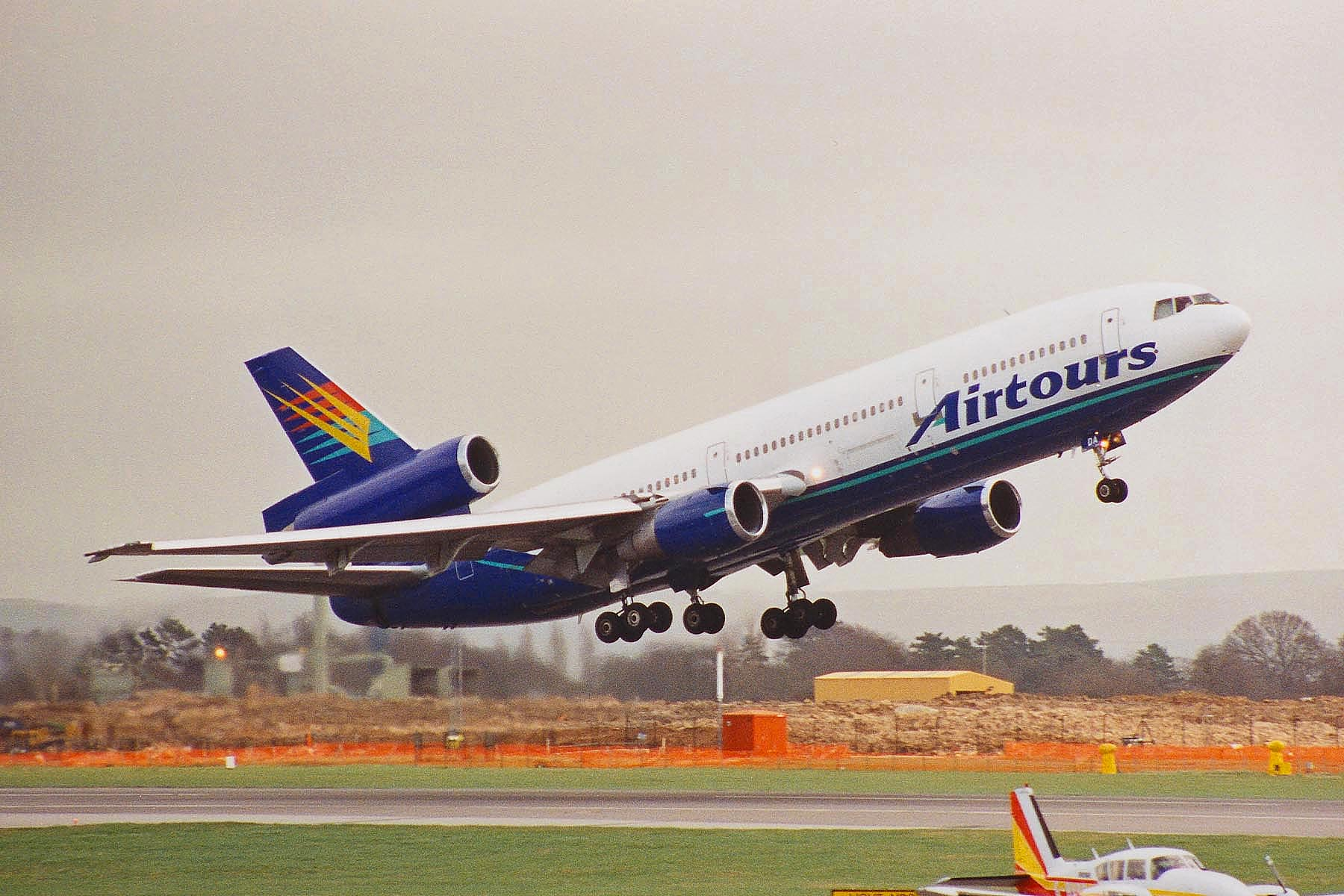
DC-10 of Airtours International Airways.

In the 1990s Airtours added long haul capabilities, with the addition of the Boeing 767 and McDonnell Douglas DC-10, flying holiday makers to destinations including the Caribbean and the United States. More Airbus aircraft joined the fleet during the 1990s with Airbus A320s, Airbus A321s and Airbus A330s accompanying the fleet of Boeing 757s, Boeing 767s and DC-10s. In 1995, the airline began offering pre-bookable seats, meal choices and duty-free on its flights – a practice that was subsequently adopted by many other UK charter airlines. The Airbus A330-200 aircraft delivered to Airtours in 1999 featured improved passenger amenities over older long haul aircraft and offered Premium Economy cabins in the form of Premiair Gold, something the Boeing 767 and DC-10 did not offer at the time. The Airbus A330-200's, operated by Thomas Cook for their long haul flights, were known for their unique cabin design. The special design forfeited several rows of seats in the middle of the plane for a steep staircase down to a lower partial deck, which incorporated a galley, three jumps seats, and 4 toilets.

On 27 January 2002, Airtours International became the first airline to use the new Swanwick Air Traffic Centre, as flight AIH550 from Las Palmas to Birmingham was handed over to the new facility.

=== Two airlines give life to MyTravel Airways ===
Following the renaming of the Airtours Group to the MyTravel Group in February 2002, the Airtours International and Premiair operations were rebranded as MyTravel Airways with effect from 1 May 2002. In October 2002 MyTravel Airways launched its scheduled low-fare airline, MyTravelLite, which went on smoothly until mid-2007. It was in fact reintegrated into the parent before it operationlly merged into Thomas Cook Airlines.

In common with airlines worldwide, MyTravel Airways saw a reduction in customers due to the effects of the September 11, 2001 attacks. Official statistics from the United Kingdom Civil Aviation Authority (see reference below) indicated that the number of passengers carried by MyTravel Airways UK increased from 7.21 million in 2001 to 7.52 million in 2002. However, the figure dropped to 4.38 million in 2005, due to the number of aircraft being reduced from 45 in early 2001 to 29 in 2005, as part of the restructuring of the wider MyTravel Group.

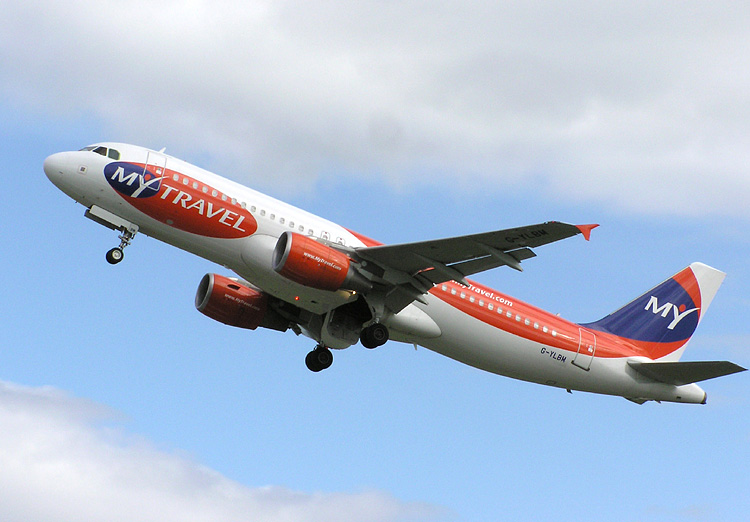
MyTravel Airways Airbus A320-200

In late 2004 the last of the McDonnell Douglas DC-10s and the last Boeing 757 were withdrawn from the fleet. MyTravel Airways was the last British airline to operate DC-10s. In December 2005, MyTravel Aircraft Engineering (MTAE) became a wholly owned subsidiary of the MyTravel Group, based at Manchester Airport. The facility performed all light maintenance checks (up to 'C' Check) for MyTravel Airways and MyTravel Airways A/S, as well as work for third party airlines such as Skyservice, and has now been re-branded Thomas Cook Airlines Engineering following the merger.

In late 2005, one of its Boeing 757-200s were used for the filming of American biographical film United 93, which was released a year later. The original flight was flown by a 757.

MyTravel Aircraft Engineering Caribbean, part of MTAE had bases throughout the Caribbean in Cancún, Cozumel, Montego Bay, Newark, New Jersey and Sanford, Florida, as well as seasonal bases at various Spanish, Greek and Turkish airports as well as Jeddah for the Hajj operation. It handled more than 3500 aircraft for over 40 airlines a year.

Due to necessary consolidation within the UK IT market, MyTravel Group PLC and Thomas Cook AG agreed to merge in March 2007 to form Thomas Cook Group PLC. Under the merger, MyTravel Airways and Thomas Cook Airlines fleets became one and the airlines became Thomas Cook Airlines, operating under MyTravel's AOC. Thomas Cook Airlines subsequently changed their callsign from 'Topjet' to MyTravel's callsign 'Kestrel'. MyTravel's last flight operated on 30 March 2008.

== Destinations ==
Most flights were operated for MyTravel Group Tour Operators as MyTravel Airways was their in-house airline. Many routes to Canada were operated by MyTravel Airways on behalf of specialist Canadian Affair. It was the only British airline to fly to Djerba from Manchester Airport and Gatwick Airport. As of 2007, MyTravel Airways flew to the following destinations:

=== Africa ===
- Egypt
  - Hurghada - Hurghada International Airport
  - Luxor - Luxor International Airport
  - Sharm El Sheikh - Sharm El Sheikh International Airport
- Kenya
  - Mombasa - Moi International Airport
- Morocco
  - Agadir - Agadir – Al Massira Airport
- Tunisia
  - Djerba - Djerba–Zarzis International Airport
  - Monastir - Monastir Habib Bourguiba International Airport

=== Americas ===
- Antigua and Barbuda
  - Antigua - V. C. Bird International Airport
- Brazil
  - Salvador de Bahia - Salvador International Airport
- Canada
  - Toronto - Toronto Pearson International Airport
  - Vancouver - Vancouver International Airport
- Barbados
  - Bridgetown - Grantley Adams International Airport
- Cuba
  - Varadero - Juan Gualberto Gómez Airport
- Dominican Republic
  - Puerto Plata - Gregorio Luperón International Airport
  - Punta Cana - Punta Cana International Airport
  - La Romana - La Romana International Airport
- Cayman Islands
  - Grand Cayman - Owen Roberts International Airport
- Jamaica
  - Montego Bay - Sangster International Airport
- Mexico
  - Cancún - Cancún International Airport
- United States
  - Las Vegas - McCarran International Airport
  - Orlando - Orlando Sanford International Airport

=== Asia ===
- China
  - Beijing - Beijing Capital International Airport
  - Hong Kong - Hong Kong International Airport
  - Sanya - Sanya Phoenix International Airport
  - Shanghai - Shanghai Pudong International Airport
- Cyprus
  - Larnaca - Larnaca International Airport
  - Paphos - Paphos International Airport
- India
  - Goa - Dabolim Airport
  - Trivandrum - Trivandrum International Airport
- Japan
  - Nagoya - Chubu Centrair International Airport
  - Osaka - Kansai International Airport
  - Tokyo - Narita International Airport
- Maldives
  - Malé - Velana International Airport
- South Korea
  - Seoul - Incheon International Airport
- Taiwan
  - Taipei - Taiwan Taoyuan International Airport
- Turkey
  - Antalya - Antalya Airport
  - Bodrum - Milas–Bodrum Airport
  - Dalaman - Dalaman Airport

=== Europe ===
- Austria
  - Salzburg - Salzburg Airport
- Belgium
  - Brussels - Brussels Airport
- Bulgaria
  - Burgas - Burgas Airport
- Czech Republic
  - Prague - Václav Havel Airport Prague
- Denmark
  - Copenhagen - Copenhagen Airport
- Finland
  - Kittilä - Kittilä Airport
- France
  - Grenoble - Alpes–Isère Airport
- Germany
  - Düsseldorf - Düsseldorf Airport
  - Frankfurt - Frankfurt Airport
  - Hamburg - Hamburg Airport
  - Hannover - Hannover Airport
  - Munich - Munich Airport
- Greece
  - Corfu - Corfu International Airport
  - Heraklion - Heraklion International Airport
  - Kalamata - Kalamata International Airport
  - Kefalonia - Kefalonia International Airport
  - Kos - Kos International Airport
  - Rhodes - Rhodes International Airport
  - Thessaloniki - Thessaloniki Airport
  - Zakynthos - Zakynthos International Airport
- Hungary
  - Budapest - Budapest Ferenc Liszt International Airport
- Italy
  - Naples - Naples International Airport** Olbia - Olbia Costa Smeralda Airport
  - Rimini - Federico Fellini International Airport
- Malta
  - Luqa - Malta International Airport
- Netherlands
  - Amsterdam - Amsterdam Airport Schiphol
- Norway
  - Oslo - Oslo Airport, Gardermoen
- Poland
  - Warsaw - Warsaw Chopin Airport
- Portugal
  - Faro - Faro Airport
- Romania
  - Bucharest - Bucharest Henri Coandă International Airport
- Russia
  - Moscow - Moscow Domodedovo Airport
- Spain
  - Alicante - Alicante–Elche Airport
  - Almería - Almería Airport
  - Fuerteventura - Fuerteventura Airport
  - Girona - Girona–Costa Brava Airport
  - Gran Canaria - Gran Canaria Airport
  - Ibiza - Ibiza Airport
  - Lanzarote - Lanzarote Airport
  - Málaga - Málaga Airport
  - Menorca - Menorca Airport
  - Palma de Mallorca - Palma de Mallorca Airport
  - Reus - Reus Airport
  - Tenerife - Tenerife South Airport
- Sweden
  - Stockholm - Stockholm Arlanda Airport
- Switzerland
  - Zurich - Zurich Airport

== Incidents ==
On 5 July 2007, a first officer who was not an employee but was paying MyTravel to gain flight experience on their aircraft (pay-to-fly) landed an Airbus A320 heavily at Kos airport in Greece, causing substantial damage to the main landing gear. The report was critical of both the pilot's training record and non-employees paying airlines to gain experience.

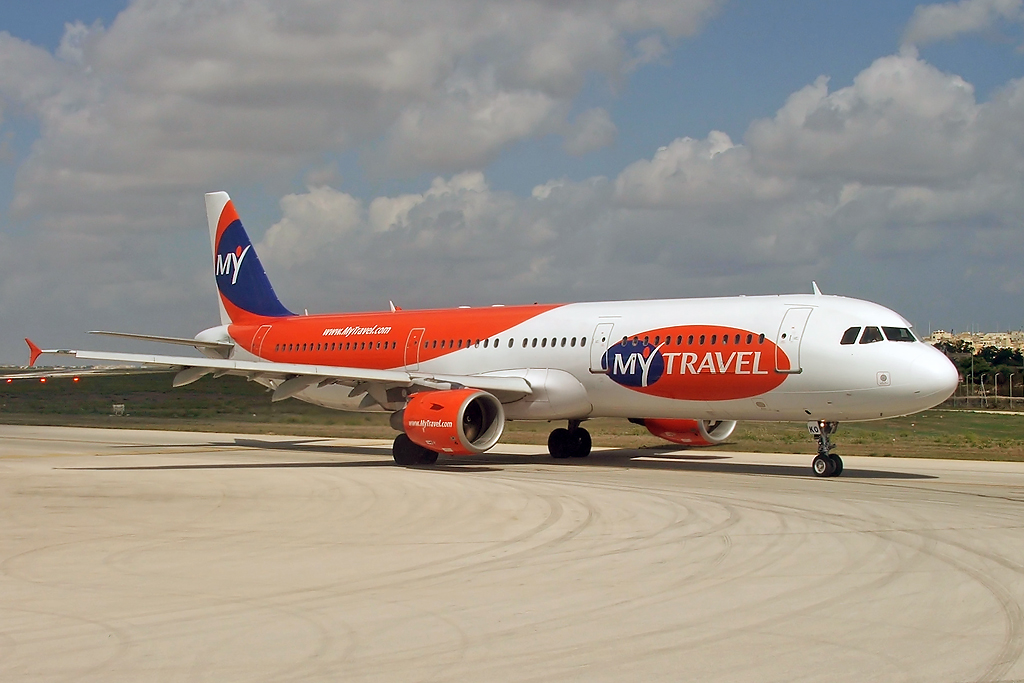
MyTravel Airways Airbus A321 at Malta International Airport

== See also ==
- List of defunct airlines of the United Kingdom
