= Thomas Cook Airlines Canada =

Charter airline of Canada (2010–2012)

IATA	ICAO	Call sign
QK	JZA	JAZZ
- Founded: April 2010
- Commenced operations: November 5, 2010
- Ceased operations: April 30, 2012
- Operating bases: Montréal–Trudeau International Airport
- Fleet size: 8
- Parent company: Thomas Cook Group
- Headquarters: Montreal, Quebec, Canada
- Website: www.thomascookairlines.com

Thomas Cook Airlines Canada was the Canadian charter brand of Thomas Cook Airlines, based in Montreal, Quebec. The airline served destinations to the Caribbean, Mexico, and to North America.

== History ==
Operations began on 5 November 2010 for the tour operator Sunquest Vacations. The airline operated with leased Boeing 757-200 aircraft from other airlines within the Thomas Cook Group, primarily from Thomas Cook Airlines. Those aircraft in turn were operated by Jazz, though still operated under the name Thomas Cook Airlines Canada. Numerous flights operated using Thomas Cook Airlines' IATA, ICAO, and callsign.

The Thomas Cook Group ended up selling Sunquest Vacations to Red Label Vacations in early 2013, thus ending the flight service agreement with Jazz. This effectively led to the airline ceasing all operations.

== Destinations ==
At the time of the closure, Thomas Cook Airlines Canada was flying to various destinations in the Caribbean, Mexico, and to North America.

== See also ==
- List of defunct airlines of Canada
