= Thomas Cook Aviation =

Leisure airline of Germany (2017–2020)

IATA	ICAO	Call sign
H3	TCN	NAUTILUS
- Founded: 24 October 2017 (as Air Berlin Aviation GmbH)
- Commenced operations: 22 March 2017
- Ceased operations: 2 April 2020
- Operating bases: Düsseldorf; Leipzig/Halle
- Fleet size: 6
- Parent company: Thomas Cook Group
- Headquarters: Frankfurt, Hesse, Germany
- Key people: Ralf Nagel (CEO)
- Website: condor.com

Thomas Cook Aviation GmbH was a German leisure airline launched in 2017 and a technical subsidiary of Condor. It operated scheduled flights exclusively on behalf of Condor to destinations throughout Europe, from its bases in Düsseldorf and Leipzig/Halle. In April 2020, the airline filed for insolvency.

== History ==
The airline was established in October 2017 as Air Berlin Aviation GmbH and was taken over by Thomas Cook Group in 2018 in order to facilitate rapid growth in Germany in the aftermath of the Air Berlin insolvency. On 31 January 2018 the airline received its Air Operator's Certificate (AOC). The company was renamed Thomas Cook Aviation on 22 November 2018.

Despite the collapse of parent company Thomas Cook Group on 23 September 2019, Thomas Cook Aviation continued its operations together with sister airline Condor. Condor ended the flying contract in spring 2020. In December 2019, the airline received its first Airbus A320, a former aircraft of now-defunct sister airline Thomas Cook Airlines Balearics. In the same month, Condor announced that after separation from the defunct Thomas Cook Group, it would update the livery of its aircraft by removing all references to its former parent company and replace the heart-shaped logo by its own company logo. The planned redesign also included the aircraft of Thomas Cook Aviation.

Thomas Cook Aviation filed for insolvency on 2 April 2020.

== Fleet ==
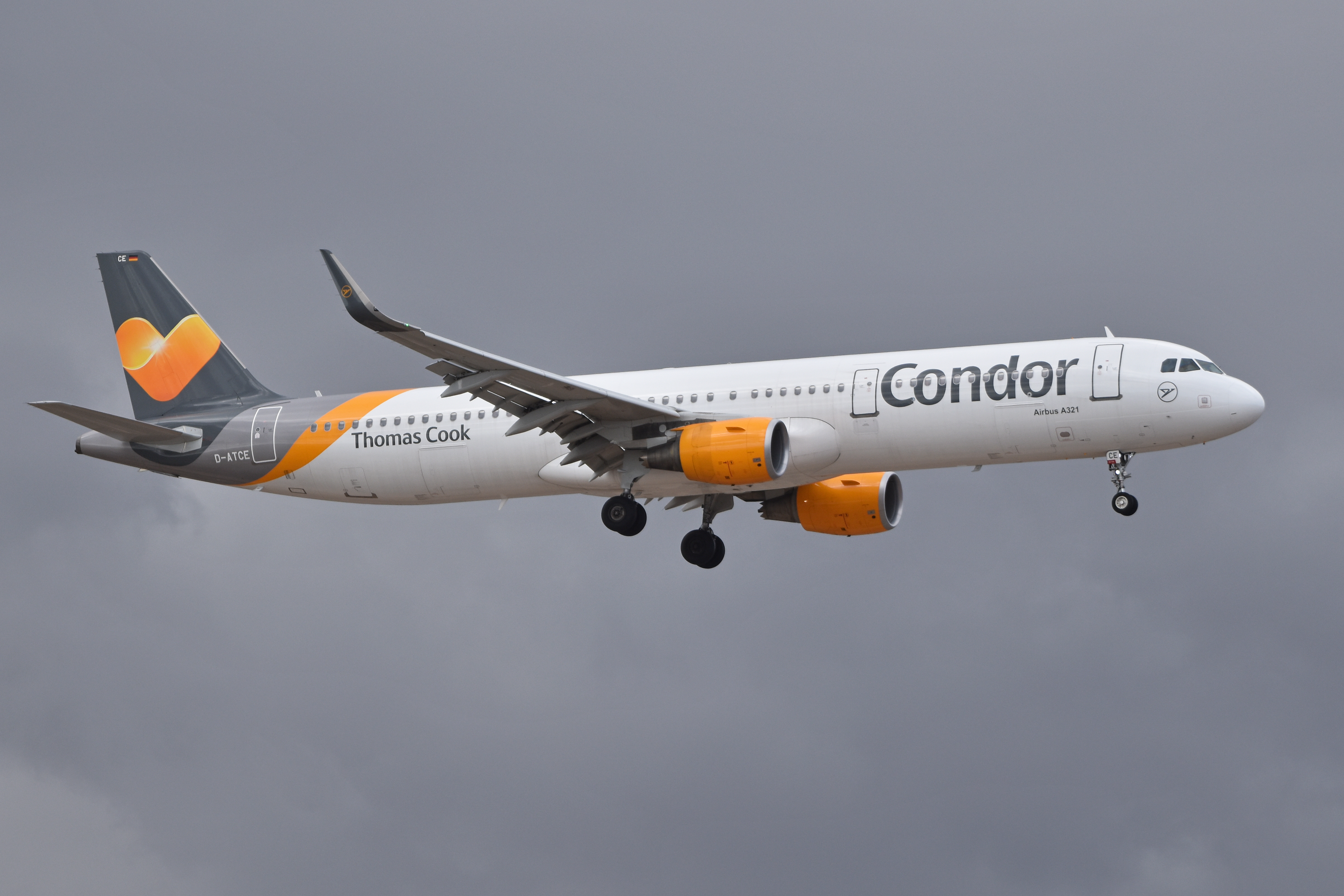
A Thomas Cook Aviation Airbus A321-200 wearing the Condor livery.

As of March 2020, the Thomas Cook Aviation fleet consisted of the following aircraft:

Thomas Cook Aviation fleet
Aircraft	In service	Orders	Passengers	Notes
Airbus A320-200	1	—	180	operated for Condor
Airbus A321-200	5	—	212	operated for Condor
Airbus A321-200	5	—	215	operated for Condor
Airbus A321-200	5	—	220	operated for Condor
Total	6			
