= David Crossland =

British entrepreneur

David Crossland (born 18 December 1946) is a British entrepreneur from east Lancashire, well known in the British travel (holiday) industry.

== Early life ==
He attended Burnley Grammar School. He left school with three O-levels.

== Career ==
He first found work in August 1963 in a travel agency within the Colne Cooperative Society's Colne Hall main offices in Albert Road, Colne from where he learnt the tricks of the trade within the travel industry and the knowledge and the leads necessary to embark on his future business career.

=== Entrepreneur ===
He formed companies and ended up being the Chief Executive of MyTravel. This had started when an elderly couple sold him two travel agent shops (Pendle Travel Services) based on Railway Street, Nelson, Lancashire, borrowing half the money from his brother-in-law. MyTravel Group was formed in 2002, and was headquartered in Rochdale (Greater Manchester). MyTravel merged in May 2007.

== Personal life ==
He lives in Jersey.
