= Peter Fankhauser =

Swiss businessman, CEO of the Thomas Cook Group

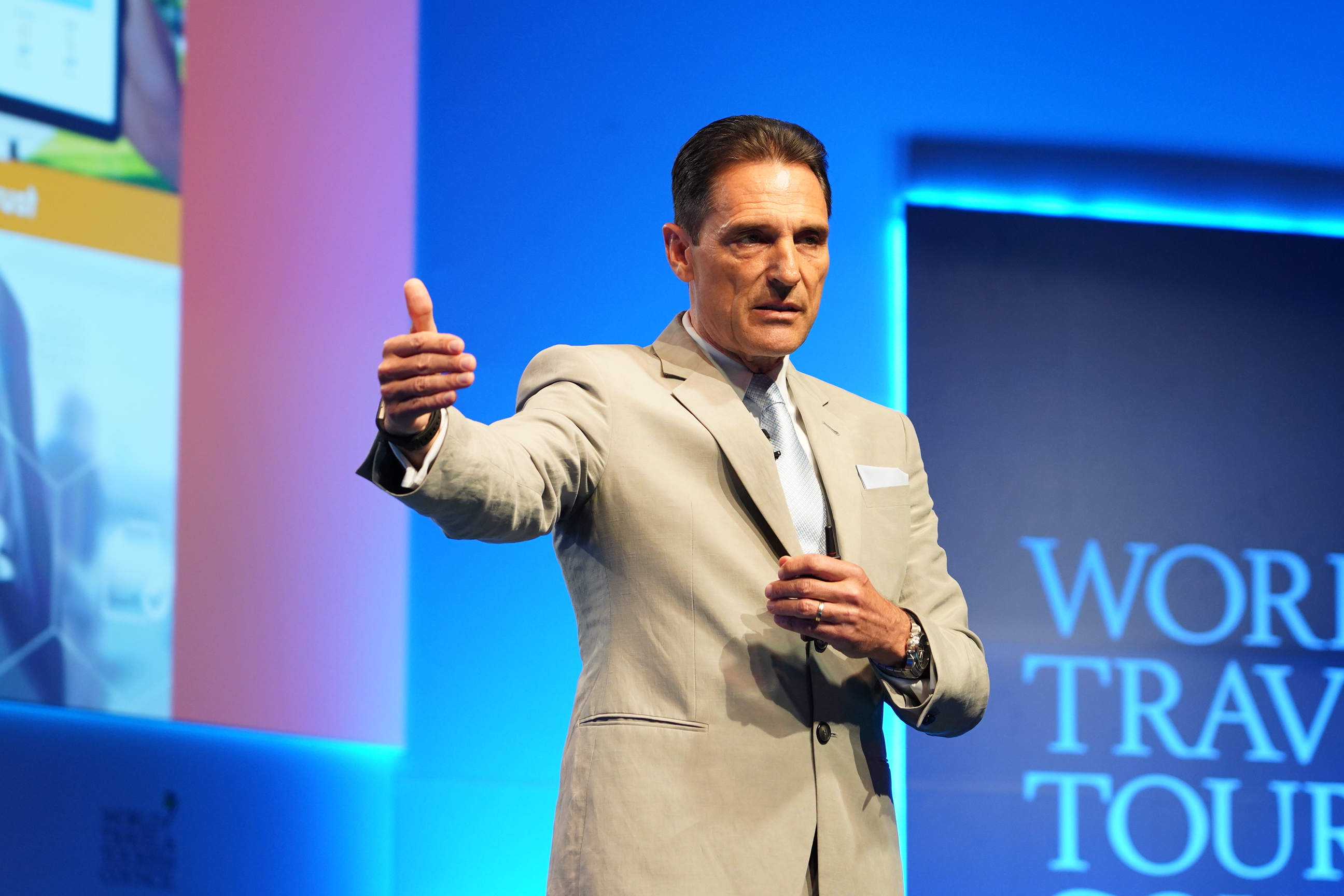
- Fankhauser in 2018
- Born: 18 November 1960 (age 65); Trub, Switzerland
- Education: University of St. Gallen
- Occupation: Businessman
- Title: Former CEO, Thomas Cook Group
- Term: November 2014 – September 2019
- Predecessor: Harriet Green
- Successor: None, compulsory liquidation
- Children: 4

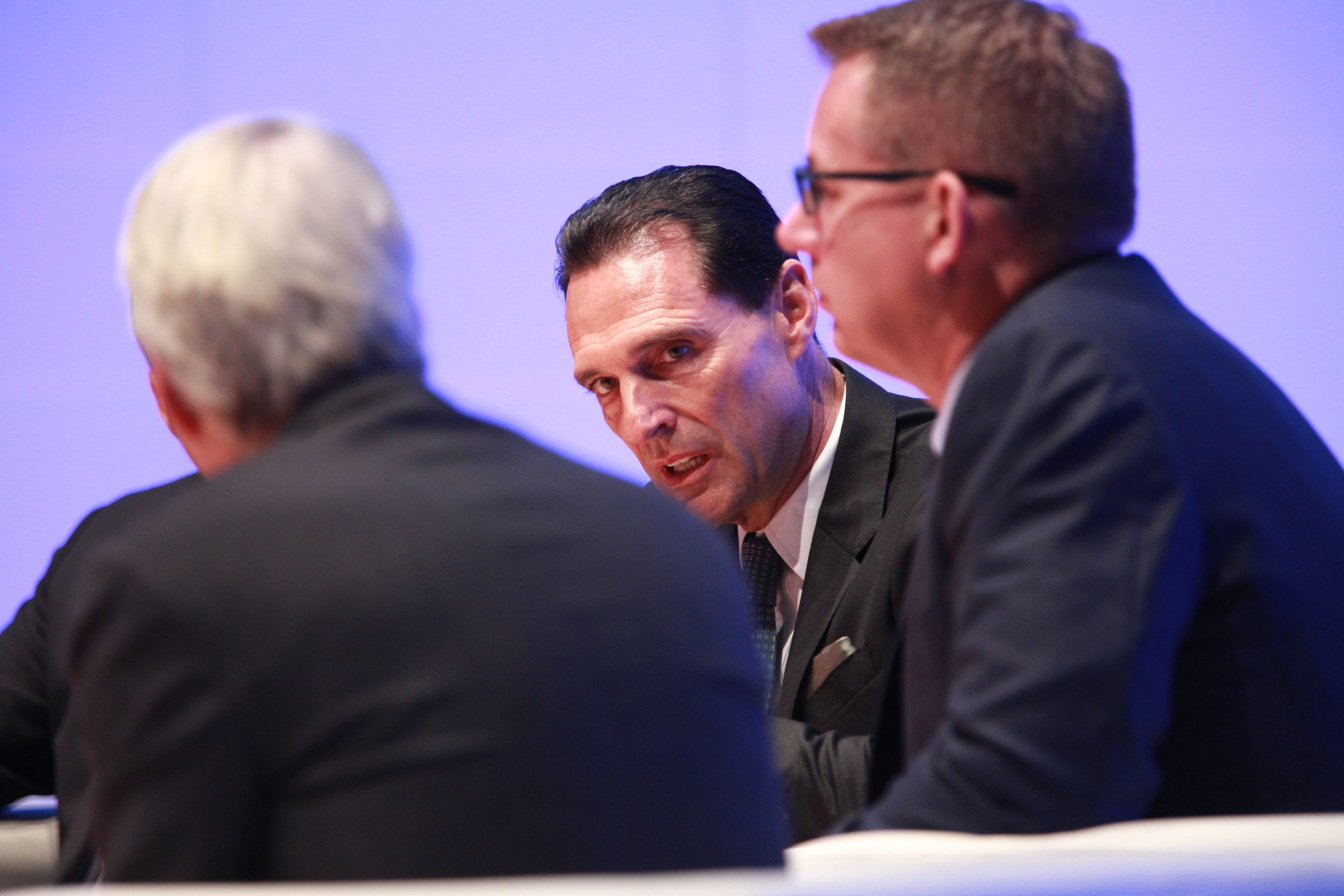
Fankhauser at the WTTC Global Summit 2017

Peter Fankhauser (born 18 November 1960) is a Swiss businessman, who was the chief executive officer (CEO) of the Thomas Cook Group from 2014 until its collapse in 2019.

== Early life and career ==
Fankhauser was born on 18 November 1960 in Trub and grew up in Burgdorf. He has a doctorate from the University of St. Gallen in political science. He was once an aerobics teacher and a national-level gymnast on the Swiss 'B' team.

He was responsible for managing the European division of the tourism company Kuoni and worked for the leisure airline LTU in Germany.

== Thomas Cook Group ==
Fankhauser joined Thomas Cook Group in 2001. He led the German business of Thomas Cook, expanded and made it the most profitable tour operator in Germany. He was promoted to chief operating officer in November 2013. In November 2014, it was announced that Harriet Green was to leave Thomas Cook Group with immediate effect, and that Fankhauser would take over as CEO.

Fankhauser received £8.3 million worth of pay since becoming CEO, including a £2.9 million bonus in 2015. During that year, he faced criticism of how Thomas Cook handled the deaths of two children whilst on holiday in Corfu. He admitted that Thomas Cook "failed to show compassion" following calls to boycott the company over its behaviour. He took changed the direction and focus of Thomas Cook on prioritising customer service, transformed it into a customer centric business. He was reinventing Thomas Cook by launching new Hotel concepts like Casa Cook and Cooks Club and expanded into China the fastest growing travel market in the world.

Thomas Cook was subject to widespread speculation about its financial position throughout 2019. By September the company had secured £900 million in funding as part of a debt-for-equity swap, including a £450 million investment from Chinese travel group Fosun International. Despite this, a late demand emerged from funders of the Group including Royal Bank of Scotland Group and Halifax, who insisted that the Group be sufficiently recapitalised to ensure operations were protected through to January, when bookings are traditionally quieter and liquidity would be challenging. This demand meant the group needed an extra £200 million guarantee to keep the company operational. These efforts did not succeed, with the UK Government Secretary of State for Transport Grant Shapps stating that they would not step in to provide a state guarantiee of £200 million, instead stating it would only support the Civil Aviation Authority response to any bankruptcy, which he said was "on track so far" and "running smoothly". Media reports indicated that a group including the Turkish government and a group of Spanish hoteliers backed by Spanish ministers had offered financial support in order to assist their domestic industries, but that the rescue had failed because "the British government said it was not prepared to provide any financial guarantees to underpin the funding package."

In the morning of 23 September the company declared bankruptcy and entered compulsory liquidation, which took effect at all Thomas Cook Group UK companies. Thomas Cook Airlines Scandinavia temporarily ceased operations, while other sister companies suspended or continued operations, depending on their corporate relationship. The liquidation left 150,000 British tourists in need of repatriation, the largest such case in British history, ahead of the 2017 collapse of Monarch Airlines. Fankhauser apologised to colleagues and customers for the "deeply sad day", but blamed banks for its collapse stating that "an additional facility requested in the last few days of negotiations presented a challenge that ultimately proved insurmountable." Hedge funds have also been noted as major beneficiaries of the events, with "Thomas Cook the most shorted company on the London Stock Exchange" prior to the collapse.

In October 2019 Fankhauser was criticised at a hearing of the House of Commons Business, Energy and Industrial Strategy Committee, its chair calling his apology "rather hollow". On 12 January 2022 Sky reported that the Group's executives have been cleared by the Insolvency Service after a two-year probe. The Service had decided to take no further action against former directors of Thomas Cook.

Fankhauser is now a professor at the University of St. Gallen and a managing partner in a consultancy company specialised in transformation.
