= Thomas Cook AG =

Former German travel company

- Formerly: C&N Touristic AG (1997–2001)
- Type: Aktiengesellschaft
- Industry: Hospitality; Tourism
- Predecessor: Thomas Cook & Son (1841–2001); C&N Touristic AG (1997–2001)
- Founded: 2001; 25 years ago (as Thomas Cook AG); 1997; 29 years ago (as C&N Touristic AG); 5 July 1841; 185 years ago (as Thomas Cook & Son Limited)
- Defunct: 19 June 2007; 19 years ago
- Fate: Merged with MyTravel Group plc
- Successor: Thomas Cook Group plc
- Headquarters: Rochdale, England, UK
- Products: Charter and scheduled passenger airlines, package holidays, cruise lines, hotels and resorts
- Subsidiaries: List of subsidiaries

Thomas Cook AG was an Anglo-German, global travel group. The group had its headquarters in Rochdale, and sold products such as package holidays and flights through its 3 in-house airlines. On 19 June 2007, the group merged with MyTravel Group plc to form the Thomas Cook Group plc, which was listed on the London Stock Exchange.

== History ==
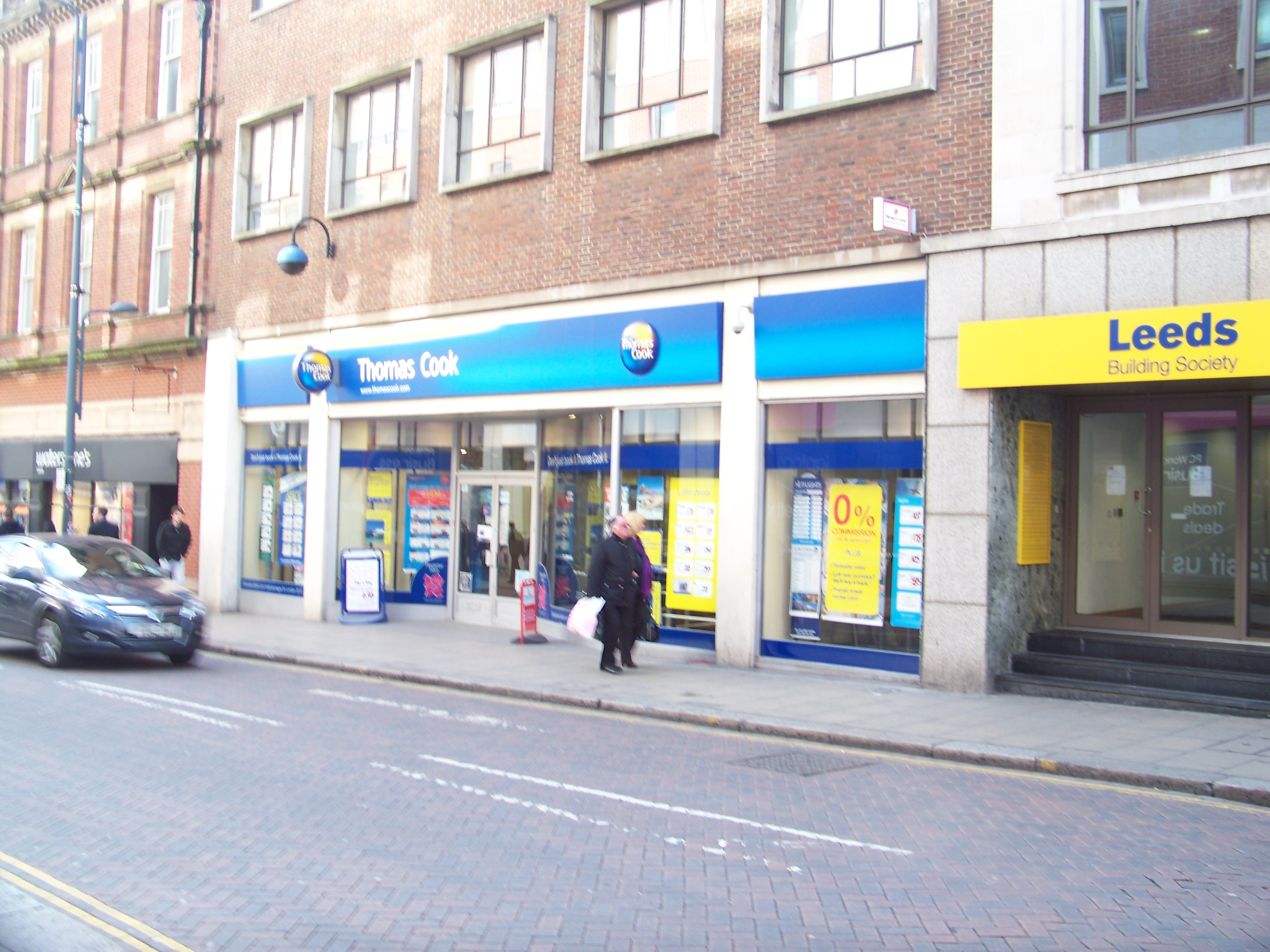
A Thomas Cook travel agency in Leeds

In 2001, Thomas Cook & Son was acquired by the German company C&N Touristic AG, which changed its name to Thomas Cook AG.

On 21 December 2005, Thomas Cook AG sold off Thomas Cook International Markets (a venture which includes 60% of the stake in Thomas Cook India Ltd) to Dubai Financial LLC, part of the Dubai Investment Group (DIG) which manages the financial and real estate interests of Sheikh Mohammed bin Rashid Al Maktoum, ruler of Dubai. Following this, Thomas Cook Overseas Limited (a wholly owned subsidiary of Thomas Cook UK) was sold off, this time again to Dubai Financial LLC.

Thomas Cook Canada was sold to Transat A.T. in 2006, marking Thomas Cook's exit from the North American market in terms of its own retailer.

On 12 February 2007, Thomas Cook AG announced that it had agreed terms on a merger with MyTravel Group to form Thomas Cook Group. The merger was completed on 19 June 2007.

== Operations ==
Companies within Thomas Cook AG before merger with MyTravel Group plc
Name	Type	Country	Logo	Fate
Thomas Cook Tour Operations Limited	Tour operator	United Kingdom	Globe	Transferred to Thomas Cook Group (2007) Entered Compulsory liquidation (2019)
Thomas Cook Retail Limited	UK travel agent and website operator	United Kingdom	Globe	Transferred to Thomas Cook Group (2007) Entered Compulsory liquidation (2019)
Thomas Cook Airlines UK Limited	UK Charter airline	United Kingdom	Globe	Merged with MyTravel Airways to form Thomas Cook Airlines (2007); entered Compulsory liquidation (2019)
JMC Airlines Limited	UK Charter airline	United Kingdom	Independent	Rebranded as Thomas Cook Airlines (2003)
Thomas Cook Airlines Belgium	Belgian Charter airline	Belgium	Globe	Transferred to Thomas Cook Group (2007) Sold to Lufthansa AG (2017)
Thomas Cook Canada	Package holiday provider and Tour operator	Canada	Globe	Sold to Transat A.T. (2006)
Thomas Cook International Markets	Travel agent and Package holiday provider	Worldwide	Globe	Sold to Dubai Financial LLC
Thomas Cook GmbH	Package holiday provider	Germany	Globe	Transferred to Thomas Cook Group (2007) Entered Compulsory liquidation (2019)
Condor Flugdienst	German Charter airline	Germany	Globe	Transferred to Thomas Cook Group (2007); provided with a bridge loan by the German Government after the collapse of Thomas Cook Group (2019)
