= MyTravel Group =

Former UK travel agency

MyTravel Group plc
- Formerly: Airtours Group plc
- Type: Public
- Traded as: LSE: MT-S; FTSE 250 Component
- Industry: Hospitality, tourism
- Founded: 1972; 54 years ago (as Airtours Group)
- Founder: David Crossland
- Defunct: 19 June 2007; 19 years ago
- Fate: Merged with Thomas Cook AG
- Successor: Thomas Cook Group plc
- Key people: Michael Beckett (Chairman); Peter McHugh (CEO)
- Products: Charter and scheduled passenger airlines, package holidays, cruise lines, hotels and resorts
- Revenue: ▲£2,790 million (2006)
- Number of employees: 13,000 (2006)
- Parent: Thomas Cook Group (2007)
- Subsidiaries: MyTravel Tour Operations; MyTravel Airways (UK); MyTravel Airways Scandinavia; BCT Travel Group; Direct Holidays; Tjæreborg; Spies; Ving; ALBA Tours; Sunquest Vacations
- Website: airtours.com at the Wayback Machine (archived 2004-11-28)

MyTravel Group plc was a British global travel group headquartered in Rochdale, England. It was founded in 1972 as Airtours Group. The group included two in-house airlines, MyTravel Airways UK and MyTravel Airways Scandinavia, and various tour operators around the world. On 19 June 2007, the group merged with Thomas Cook AG to form the Thomas Cook Group plc, which entered compulsory liquidation on 23 September 2019.

== History ==
The group was founded under the Airtours brand in 1972, when David Crossland purchased a series of small travel agencies in Lancashire, United Kingdom. The group began operating package holidays and launched its own in-house charter airline, Airtours International Ltd. in late 1990. It offered their first charter flights to the Caribbean in the following year for just £299.

In 1993 Airtours purchased Aspro Holidays and their in-house airline Inter European Airways. The aircraft were merged into Airtours International and repainted in their livery.

In 1994, Airtours purchased Scandinavian Leisure Group and in 1996 it bought Simon Spies Holding, a Danish rival.

In 2002, Airtours Group plc, rebranded under the new company-wide banner of MyTravel Group plc. This included a name change for Airtours International and Premiair to MyTravel Airways in February.

In November 2003, MyTravel sold off its North America Cruise Division to NLG (National Leisure Group) of Woburn, Massachusetts.

On 12 February 2007, MyTravel Group plc announced that they had agreed terms on a merger with Thomas Cook AG to form Thomas Cook Group plc. The airline operations were merged into Thomas Cook Airlines in March of the following year.

== Operations ==
=== Tour Operators ===
Name	Country	Fate
MyTravel Tour Operations Limited	United Kingdom	Merged into Thomas Cook Tour Operations
Panorama Holiday Group Limited	United Kingdom	Transferred to Thomas Cook Group (2007) Dissolution (2014)
BCT Travel Group Limited	United Kingdom	Transferred to Thomas Cook Group (2007) Rebranded to Thomas Cook Scheduled Tour Operations Limited (2008) Dissolution (2015)
Direct Holidays plc	United Kingdom	Dissolution (2013)
Tjæreborg	Denmark; Finland	Transferred to Thomas Cook Group (2007)
Spies	Denmark	Transferred to Thomas Cook Group (2007)
Ving	Denmark; Norway; Sweden	Transferred to Thomas Cook Group (2007)
ALBA Tours	Canada	Transferred to Thomas Cook Group (2007)
Sunquest Vacations	Canada	Transferred to Thomas Cook Group (2007) Sold to Red Label Vacations (2013)

=== Airlines ===
Airline	Country	Image	Description	Fate
MyTravel Airways Limited	United Kingdom		MyTravel Airways Limited was a British scheduled and charter airline, formerly known as Airtours International.	Transferred to Thomas Cook Group (2007) Merged with Thomas Cook Airlines UK (2008)
MyTravel Airways A/S	Denmark		MyTravel Airways was a Scandinavian scheduled and charter airline.	Transferred to Thomas Cook Group (2007) Rebranded to Thomas Cook Airlines Scandinavia (2008)
