= Thomas Cook Airlines Belgium =

Charter airline of Belgium (2001–2017)

IATA	ICAO	Call sign
HQ	TCW	THOMAS COOK
- Founded: 12 December 2001
- Commenced operations: 13 March 2002
- Ceased operations: 27 October 2017
- Operating bases: Brussels Airport
- Fleet size: 5
- Destinations: 36
- Parent company: Thomas Cook Group
- Headquarters: Zaventem, Belgium
- Key people: Jean-Christophe Degen
- Website: thomascookairlines.be

Thomas Cook Airlines Belgium was a Belgian leisure airline owned by the Thomas Cook Group. It operated scheduled flights to destinations throughout Europe and Africa from its base at Brussels Airport. The airline operated from 2002 until 2017.

== History ==
The airline was established on 12 December 2001 by the Thomas Cook Group to serve the Belgian holiday market, and started operations on 13 March 2002. Until January 2004, flight tickets could only be purchased via travel agencies as part of package tours; since then individual seat reservations are also possible. The airline had several sister companies, Thomas Cook Airlines, Thomas Cook Airlines Scandinavia and Condor, all of which have a joint fleet management.

In March 2017, parent company Thomas Cook announced its intention to sell its Belgian operations to Lufthansa. Consequently, Thomas Cook Airlines Belgium was shut down by late October 2017 with two aircraft and all traffic rights being handed to Brussels Airlines. Its three remaining aircraft were to be relocated to Thomas Cook Airlines Belgium's sister companies. The last flight was HQ1508 from Tenerife South Airport to Brussels Airport on 27 October 2017.

This would have led to the layoff of 40 non-flying staff members, but Dutch group SHS Aviation announced it would take over the flight licences, two of the three remaining aircraft, and the remaining 40 employees, and integrate them into a new airline, confusingly called "VLM Airlines" though no longer connected to the Antwerp VLM Airlines (since defunct), with the remaining single Airbus A320-200 transferred elsewhere within the Thomas Cook Group. This company has since been acquired from SHS Aviation by Dutch investors FS Aviation Management B.V. Flight operations were briefly restarted between November 11, 2017 and December 18, 2018.

== Destinations ==
At the time of the closure, Thomas Cook Airlines Belgium was flying to 36 destinations in Cape Verde, Egypt, Morocco, Tunisia and several European countries.

== Fleet ==
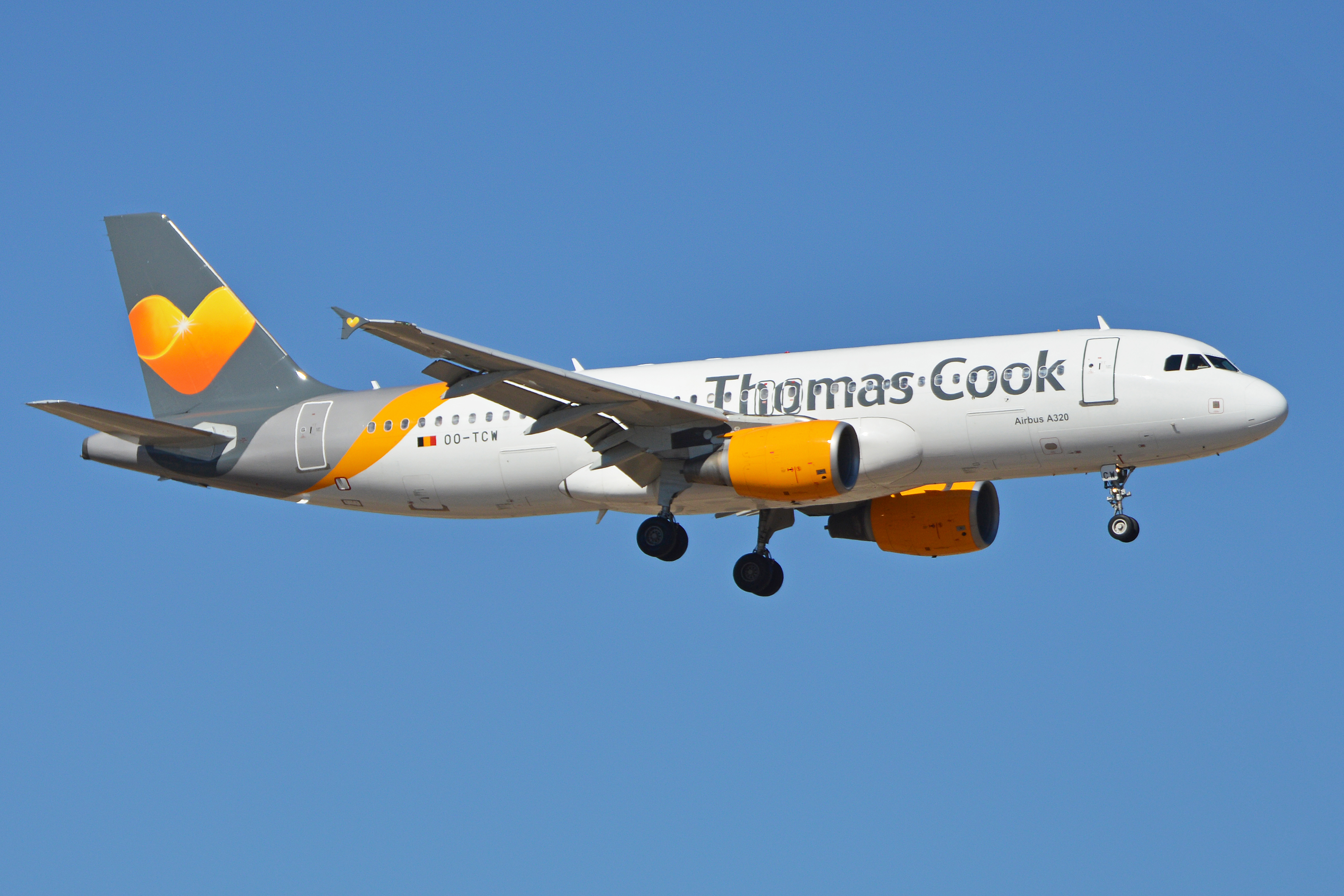
A Thomas Cook Airlines Belgium Airbus A320-200

The final Thomas Cook Airlines Belgium fleet consisted of the following aircraft:

Thomas Cook Airlines Belgium fleet
Aircraft	Historic	Orders	Passengers			Notes
Aircraft	Historic	Orders	Y+	Y	Total	Notes
Airbus A320-200	5	—	–	180	180	2 transferred to Brussels Airlines; 2 transferred to re-formed VLM Airlines; 1 transferred to Thomas Cook Airlines
Total	5	—				
