= Thomas Cook Group =

Global travel group (2007–2019)

Thomas Cook Group plc
- Final logo of the company, which was used from 2013 to 2019, before the closure

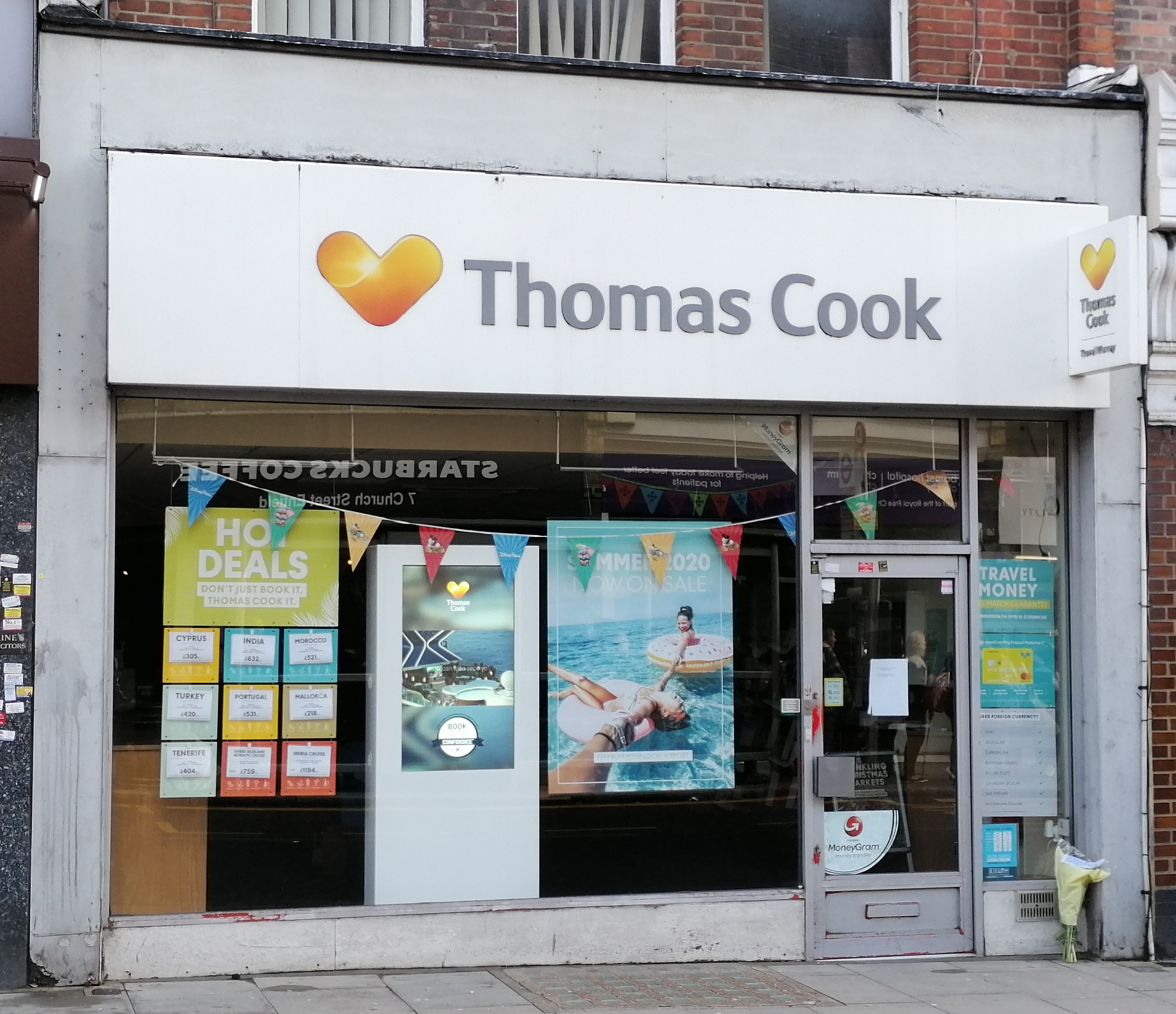
- A Thomas Cook store in the United Kingdom, later operated by Hays Travel
- Trade name: Thomas Cook Group
- Type: Public
- Traded as: LSE: TCG; FWB: TCG
- ISIN: GB00B1VYCH82
- Industry: Hospitality; Tourism
- Predecessors: Thomas Cook & Son; Thomas Cook AG; MyTravel Group
- Founded: 5 July 1841; 185 years ago in Leicester, England as Thomas Cook
- Founder: Thomas Cook
- Defunct: 23 September 2019; 7 years ago
- Fate: Ceased trading and entered into compulsory liquidation
- Successors: Hays Travel (acquisition of Thomas Cook UK travel stores); Sunclass Airlines (formerly Thomas Cook Airlines Scandinavia); Thomas Cook Holidays (Fosun Tourism Group) (acquisition of Thomas Cook name and logo, Casa Cook and Cook's Club hotel brands by Fosun); Condor Flugdienst GmbH
- Headquarters: London, England, United Kingdom
- Area served: Global
- Key people: Frank Meysman (Non-Executive Chairman); Peter Fankhauser (CEO)
- Products: Charter and scheduled passenger airlines, package holidays, cruise lines, hotels and resorts
- Services: Package holidays; Flights; Hotels
- Revenue: ▲£9,584 million (2018)
- Operating income: ▲£250 million (2018)
- Net income: ▼ -£163 million (2018)
- Number of employees: 21,000
- Divisions: Thomas Cook Group Airlines
- Subsidiaries: Thomas Cook Retail; Thomas Cook Airlines UK; Thomas Cook Airlines Balearics; Thomas Cook Airlines Scandinavia; Condor; Thomas Cook Aviation; Club 18-30 (1998–2018); Thomas Cook Hotels & Resorts; Thomas Cook Tour Operations (UK); Tjäreborg; Spies; Neckermann; Neckermann Reisen; Öger Tours; Bucher Reisen; Air Marin; Ving

Thomas Cook Group plc was a global travel group, headquartered in the United Kingdom and listed on the London Stock Exchange from its formation on 19 June 2007 by the merger of Thomas Cook AG — successor to Thomas Cook & Son — and MyTravel Group until 23 September 2019, when it went into compulsory liquidation. The group operated as a tour operator and airline, and also operated travel agencies in Europe. At the time of the group's collapse, approximately 21,000 worldwide employees were left without jobs (including 9,000 UK staff) and 600,000 customers (150,000 from the UK) were left abroad, triggering the UK's largest peacetime repatriation.

After the collapse, segments of the company were purchased by others, including the travel stores in the UK, the airlines, the Thomas Cook name and logo, the hotel brands and the tour operators. Thomas Cook India has been an entirely separate entity since August 2012, when it was acquired by Fairfax Financial and thus was not affected. In September 2020, Fosun International launched Thomas Cook Holidays as the successor to the company, hiring some former Thomas Cook Group staff in the process.

== History ==
=== Formation ===
In February 2007, it was announced that Thomas Cook AG and MyTravel Group plc were to merge. The companies announced they expected to make savings of over £75 million a year, following the integration of the two businesses. Under the terms of the merger, the owners of Thomas Cook AG, KarstadtQuelle (later Arcandor), owned 52% of the new group. The shareholders of MyTravel Group owned the remaining 48% share. The merger was completed in June 2007, and took place through the formation of 'NewCo' which effectively purchased MyTravel and Thomas Cook and was then listed on the London Stock Exchange under the name of Thomas Cook Group plc.

=== 2008–2009 ===
Thomas Cook Group logo between 2007 and 2013

On 14 February 2008, Thomas Cook bought booking website Hotels4U.com for £21.8 million. On 6 March 2008, the company bought back its licence to operate the Thomas Cook brand in the Middle East and Asia from the Dubai Investment Group for an amount estimated to be around 249 million euros. In April 2008 Thomas Cook bought the luxury travel firm Elegant Resorts from its founders Geoff Moss and Barbara Catchpole for an undisclosed figure. The company took over Preston-based Gold Medal International, owner of NetFlights, in a deal worth £87 million in December 2008.

On 8 March 2009, Thomas Cook signed a deal with Octopus Media Technology to host, upload, and provide an online video player for Thomas Cook TV. In Spring 2009 Thomas Cook UK signed a deal with International Entertainment Supplier The E3 Group, to exclusively supply entertainment to the group. In June 2009, Thomas Cook's majority shareholder Arcandor filed for bankruptcy, although the group was not affected. Arcandor's shares in Thomas Cook were sold by its creditor banks in September 2009.

=== 2010–2015 ===
In July 2010, Thomas Cook Group bought German tourism company Öger Tours, which was owned by Vural Öger.

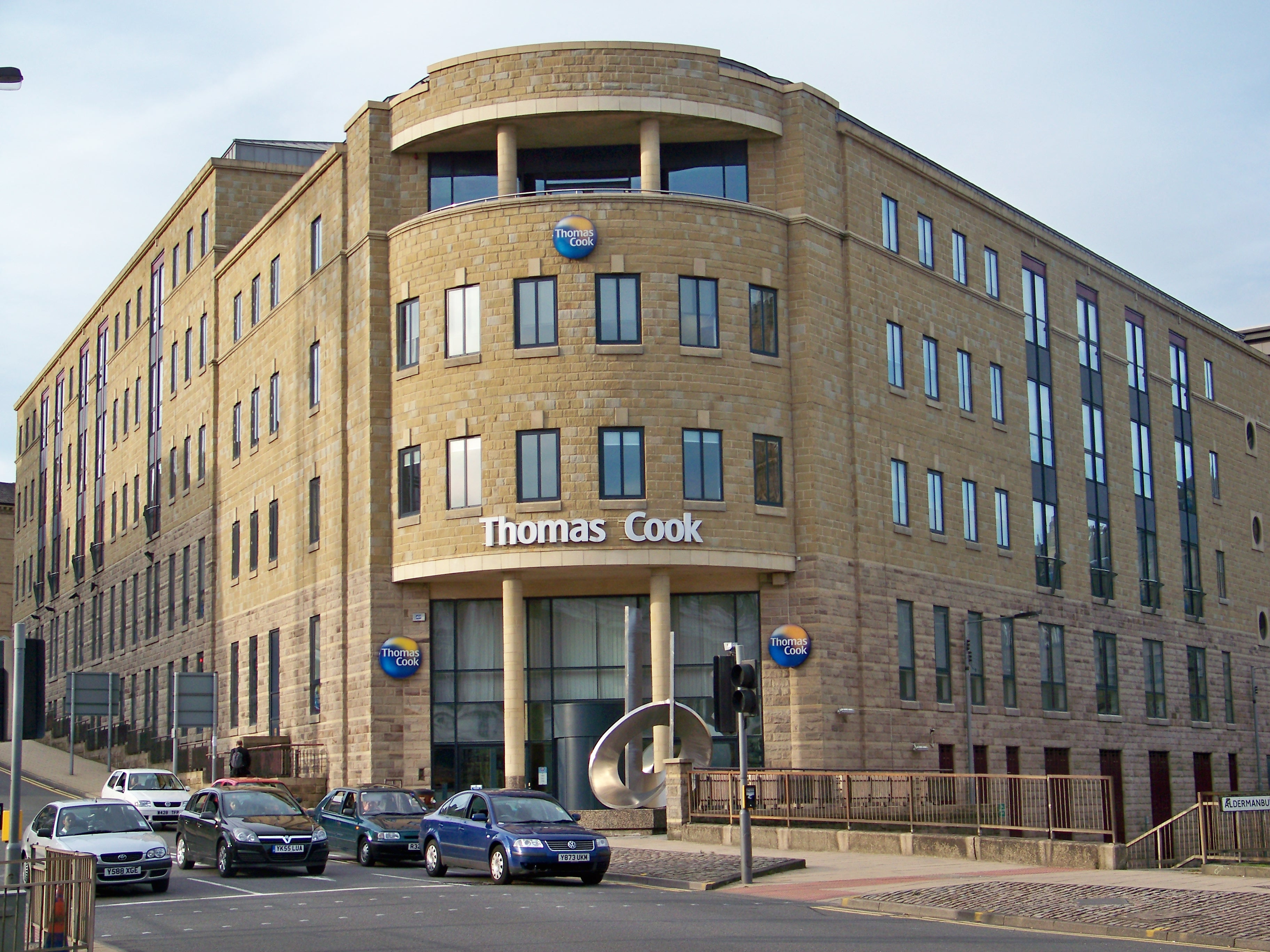
Thomas Cook Travel agency in Bradford, with the 2001–2013 logo of the company

In 2010, the Thomas Cook Group reached an agreement with The Co-operative Group to merge its branch network with that of The Co-operative Travel. The merger was approved by the Competition Commission in 2011, and the joint venture was 66.5% owned by the Thomas Cook Group, 30% owned by The Co-operative Group and 3.5% owned by the Midlands Co-operative (renamed the Central England Co-operative in 2014). The merger created the UK's largest travel network. Thomas Cook's Going Places branded branches were rebranded under the Co-operative's brand.

In May 2012, Harriet Green was appointed as the chief executive officer of Thomas Cook Group, succeeding Manny Fontenla-Novoa, who was CEO from 2003 until August 2011. On 1 July 2013, Thomas Cook announced that it would cease publishing the Thomas Cook European Timetable, along with closure of the rest of its publishing business. The final edition of the timetable was published in August 2013, but publication resumed in early 2014 under a new publishing company not affiliated with Thomas Cook.

In February 2014 Thomas Cook Group sold Gold Medal Travel, including Netflights.com, to dnata for a reported £45 million. On 26 November 2014, it was announced that Green was leaving with immediate effect, and that COO Peter Fankhauser would take over as CEO.

==== Inquest into carbon monoxide poisoning ====
In October 2006, two young British children, Christianne and Robert Shepherd aged seven and six years old respectively, died from carbon monoxide poisoning caused by a faulty boiler while on a holiday in Corfu booked through Thomas Cook. They were the first such deaths in the company's history. Two Thomas Cook employees were subsequently amongst 11 defendants facing manslaughter by negligence charges at a criminal trial in Greece in 2010; both were acquitted and the company was cleared of any wrongdoing.

In 2015, a UK inquest was held into the children's deaths; the jury returned a verdict of unlawful killing and concluded that the travel group had "breached its duty of care".

After the inquest, The Mail on Sunday published a news story saying that Thomas Cook had received £3 million from the owners of the hotel where the children's deaths had occurred. In response, Thomas Cook made a charitable donation of £1.5m to UNICEF. However, the children's family said that they had not been consulted about this donation, which became the subject of criticism. In UK newspaper The Independent Joanna Bourke wrote: "Nothing Thomas Cook could ever do would bring back the two children killed by carbon monoxide poisoning on a Greek holiday in 2006. But the firm's handling of the case has been a lesson in how not to manage a crisis".

=== 2016–2018 ===
In 2016 the Co-operative Group decided that it would exercise its option to quit the branch network joint venture. Thomas Cook Group announced it would buy out the stakes in The Co-operative Travel owned by The Co-operative Group and Central England Co-operative, taking full control of the retail network and re-branding the high street travel stores that had operated under the Co-operative brand gradually during 2017–18.

In March 2017, Thomas Cook announced the sale of its Belgian airline operations to Lufthansa. As a result, Thomas Cook Airlines Belgium was shut down by November 2017 with two aircraft and all traffic rights being handed to Brussels Airlines. Its three remaining aircraft were relocated to sister companies.

In August 2018, a British couple, John and Susan Cooper, aged 69 and 63 respectively, died on a Thomas Cook holiday, while staying at the Steigenberger Aqua Magic in the Red Sea resort of Hurghada. According to the Egyptian authorities, John died of a heart attack and Susan died of shock. The couple's daughter, also present at the resort, blamed the faulty air conditioning system at the resort. Thomas Cook hurriedly evacuated around 300 holidaymakers staying in the same hotel after other guests started to fall ill.

In November 2018, business analysts suggested that Thomas Cook should split the business to help recover its financial health.

=== 2019: Final year and collapse ===
In February 2019, the Financial Times newspaper said that the Thomas Cook Group had received bids for its airline business, which included Condor, and also the company as a whole. In March 2019, Thomas Cook UK announced 21 travel office closures and the redundancy of 300 staff, justifying the decision with the fact that 64% of bookings had been made online in 2018.

In May 2019, the company reported that it had secured £300 million of emergency funding from its banks. Then in May 2019, the company announced a loss of £1.5 billion for the first half of its financial year, with £1.1 billion of the loss being attributable to goodwill write-downs. In June 2019, Thomas Cook said that it was in talks with the Chinese company Fosun International with regard to the possible sale of its tour operator business. On 28 August 2019, Thomas Cook announced that Fosun would pay £450 million for 75% of the firm's tour business and 25% of its airline.

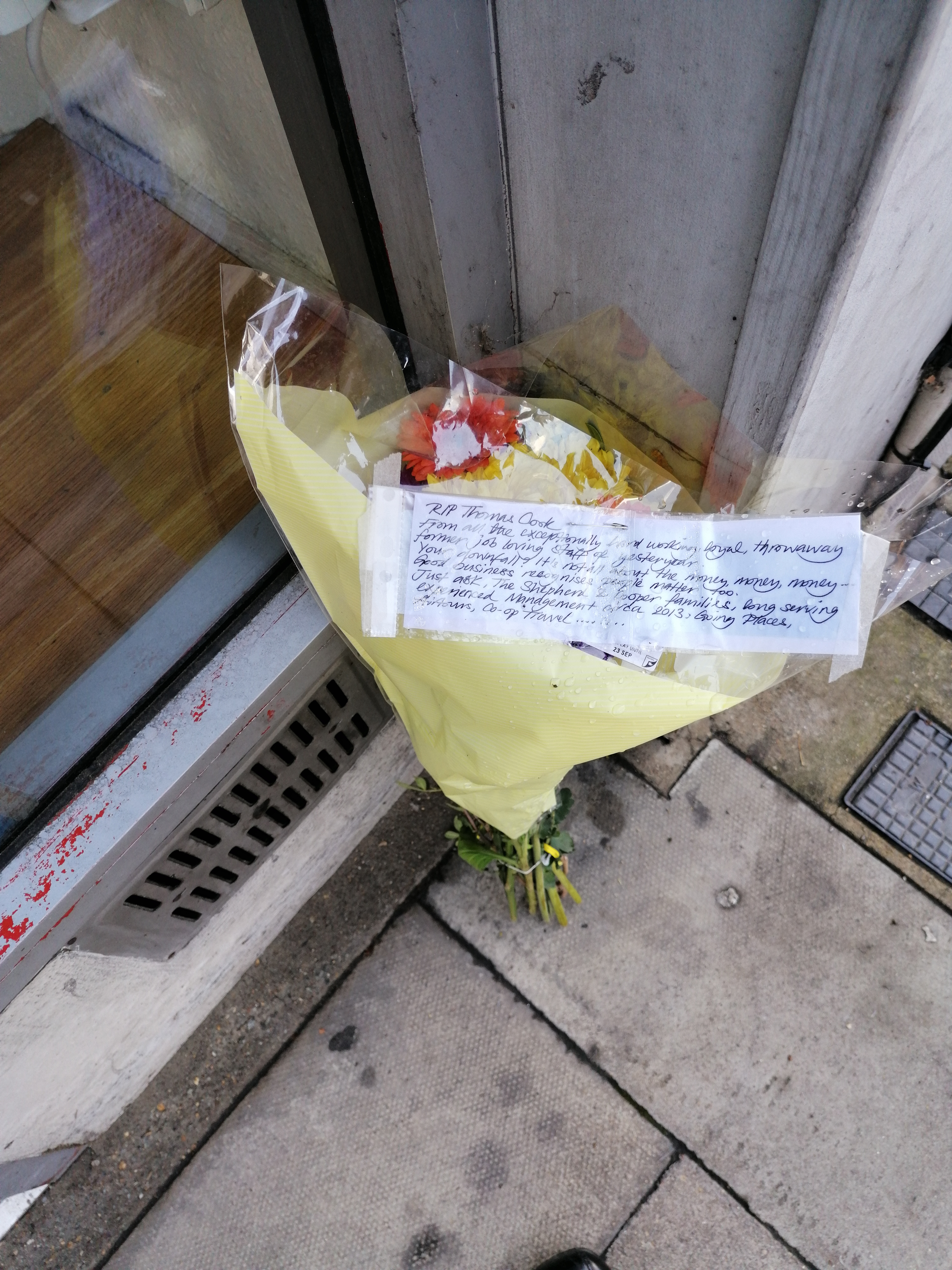
"R.I.P. Thomas Cook" – flowers at a branch of Thomas Cook in London

By September 2019, Thomas Cook Group was "the most shorted company on the London Stock Exchange", and reports began to emerge that the company was "in last minute negotiations" with bondholders, in order to approve the Fosun takeover. Less than a week later, Thomas Cook asked HM Government to fund a £200 million gap in the company's finances to prevent the firm falling into administration. The company had by that point secured £900m in funding as part of a debt-for-equity swap, including £450m from Fosun.

Despite this, a late demand is reported to have emerged from the Group's funders, including Royal Bank of Scotland and Halifax, who insisted that the Group be sufficiently recapitalised to ensure operations were protected through to January, when bookings are traditionally quieter and liquidity would be challenging. This demand meant the group needed an extra £200 million of funding to keep the company operational. These efforts did not succeed, with the UK Government Secretary of State for Transport Grant Shapps rejecting any discussion of UK intervention. Media reports had earlier indicated that a group, including the Turkish government and a group of Spanish hoteliers backed by Spanish ministers, had offered financial support in order to assist their domestic industries, but that rescue had failed because "the British government said it was not prepared to provide any financial guarantees to underpin the funding package."

A final failed attempt to prevent the Thomas Cook Group from administration or liquidation took place the evening of 22 September 2019. At around midnight on 23 September, airports in the UK began to impound Thomas Cook aircraft upon arrival, citing "default in payment of airport charges". Shortly after 02:00 BST, the Civil Aviation Authority (CAA) announced that the Thomas Cook Group had entered liquidation and ceased operations with immediate effect, leaving around 600,000 tourists overseas. The collapse of the company marked the end of a brand name that had been in continuous use since 1841.

The collapse triggered an operation initiated by the CAA, aiming to repatriate 150,000 British citizens from abroad. The operation was codenamed 'Operation Matterhorn' and overtook the 2017 collapse of Monarch Airlines as the UK's biggest peacetime repatriation. Around 40 aircraft from various airlines, including easyJet and Virgin Atlantic, as well as at least one Airbus A380 from Malaysia Airlines, were chartered. Insurance companies took care of customers from Germany, one of the former company's biggest markets.

David McHugh of CTV News reported that there were many factors that led to the collapse: a high debt load of £1.6 billion ($2 billion) combined with a changing travel market and online competition, events such as terrorist attacks in tourist destinations including Tunisia, the European heat wave in 2018, uncertainty caused by Brexit, and high fuel costs.

=== Post-collapse ===
On 9 October 2019, independent travel agent Hays Travel announced that it had acquired all 555 former Thomas Cook travel stores in the UK, and planned to re-employ a "significant number" of former employees. Hays, which already operated 190 of their own stores, expected to retain over 25% of the retail staff, saving roughly 2,500 jobs.

Meanwhile, on 30 October 2019, an investment consortium consisting of Norwegian property tycoon Petter Stordalen and private equity firms Altor and TDR Capital announced that they had acquired the assets of Thomas Cook Northern Europe (also known as the Ving Group) including the Ving, Spies and Tjäreborg travel agencies, Thomas Cook Airlines Scandinavia, and the Sunwing and Sunprime hotel brands, with Stordalen and Altor owning 40% each and TDR Capital owning the remaining 20%. Thomas Cook Airlines Scandinavia was then rebranded as Sunclass Airlines. There were reports on 31 October 2019 that Swiss-based investment firm LMEY Investments intended to re-acquire the Aldiana hotel brand, which it jointly owned with Thomas Cook, by buying Thomas Cook's 42% minority shareholding.

Fosun International purchased the Thomas Cook name and logo, along with the Casa Cook and Cook's Club hotel brands, for £11 million on 1 November 2019. Then, on 8 November 2019, it was announced that Thomas Cook's airport slots had been sold to easyJet and Jet2holidays for £36 million, with the former acquiring Gatwick and Bristol and the latter acquiring Birmingham, London Stansted and Manchester. Thomas Cook Germany announced that it would close down on 1 December 2019, after having failed to find a buyer, with administrators in talks to sell Thomas Cook Germany's tour operators Öger Tours, Bucher Reisen, Neckermann and Air Marin and find buyers for hotel brands Sentido and Smartline.

Neşet Koçkar, the chairman of Turkish tour operator Anex Tours, acquired Russian tour operator Intourist from Thomas Cook's liquidators on 15 November 2019. Meanwhile, Anex Tours acquired Thomas Cook Germany's tour operators Öger Tours and Bucher Reisen, saving 84 jobs, on 21 November 2019. Anex Tours also acquired the trademark rights for tour operator Neckermann Reisen from Thomas Cook Germany's liquidators on 2 January 2020.

The German travel group DER Touristik acquired the Sentido hotel brand, with the deal subject to antitrust approval, on 4 December 2019. Thomas Cook Balearics had closed down after becoming insolvent on 26 December 2019.

On 24 January 2020, it was announced that Polish carrier LOT Polish Airlines had acquired German airline Condor, with the acquisition expected to be completed by April 2020 once antitrust approval had been secured. However, on 13 April 2020, it was announced that LOT Polish Airlines had withdrawn its offer to acquire German airline Condor, with the German government agreeing to support Condor with emergency liquidity. The German airline Thomas Cook Aviation filed for bankruptcy due to the COVID-19 pandemic on 2 April 2020.

On 16 September 2020, Fosun International relaunched Thomas Cook as Thomas Cook Holidays, an online travel company with 50 employees.

In September 2024, Thomas Cook Tourism became part of eSky Group, a European online travel company offering flights, accommodation, city breaks and package holidays. The acquisition strengthened eSky Group's presence in the UK travel market.

== Corporate affairs ==
Below are the financial records of the Thomas Cook Group plc between 2008 and 2018 and the combination of Thomas Cook AG and MyTravel Group in 2007.

Thomas Cook Group plc – annual figures
Year	Revenue	Net Income	CEO	Chairman
2007	€9.4 billion	€284 million	Manny Fontenla-Novoa	Thomas Middelhoff
2008	£8.1 billion	▼£49.5 million	Manny Fontenla-Novoa	Thomas Middelhoff
2009	▲£9.2 billion	▲£56.1 million	Manny Fontenla-Novoa	Michael Beckett
2010	▼£8.8 billion	▼£41.7 million	Manny Fontenla-Novoa	Michael Beckett
2011	▲£9.8 billion	▼ −(£398.2) million	Manny Fontenla-Novoa	Frank Meysman
2012	▼£9.4 billion	▼ −(£485.3) million	Manny Fontenla-Novoa Sam Weihagen (Interim) Harriet Green	Frank Meysman
2013	▼£9.3 billion	▲ −(£158.1) million	Harriet Green	Frank Meysman
2014	▼£8.5 billion	▲ −(£114) million	Harriet Green Peter Fankhauser	Frank Meysman
2015	▼£7.8 billion	▲£50 million	Peter Fankhauser	Frank Meysman
2016	£7.8 billion	▼£42 million	Peter Fankhauser	Frank Meysman
2017	▲£9 billion	▲£46 million	Peter Fankhauser	Frank Meysman
2018	▲£9.5 billion	▼ −(£53) million	Peter Fankhauser	Frank Meysman

== Ownership ==
At the time of the 2007 merger, 52% of the shares in the new company were held by the German mail-order and department store company Arcandor (the former owner of Thomas Cook AG) and 48% owned by the shareholders of MyTravel Group. Arcandor filed for bankruptcy in June 2009, and its shares in Thomas Cook were sold in September 2009.

As of June 2016, Thomas Cook Group plc's three major shareholders were Invesco (19%), Standard Life Investments (10%), and the business magnate and investor Guo Guangchang (7.03%). The remainder of the stock floated freely.

== Operations ==
Thomas Cook Group employed approximately 21,000 staff worldwide, with 9,000 in the United Kingdom.

=== UK retail arm ===
Thomas Cook Retail Limited was the UK travel agent, and successor to Thomas Cook & Son stores. It was a subsidiary of the Thomas Cook Group, who operated a total of 555 travel stores all over the United Kingdom. The agents primarily sold package holidays under the in-house British tour operator Thomas Cook Tour Operations, and flight-only bookings with Thomas Cook Airlines. On 23 September 2019, the business entered compulsory liquidation, like all other UK entities in the group.

=== Tour operators ===
Tour operator	Country	Logo	Group Tenure	Fate
Thomas Cook Tour Operations	United Kingdom	Sunny Heart	2001–2019	Compulsory liquidation; closed down on 23 September 2019.
Thomas Cook Germany	Germany	Sunny Heart	2001–2019	Compulsory liquidation; closed down on 1 December 2019.
Thomas Cook France	France	Sunny Heart	2001–2019	Compulsory liquidation.
Thomas Cook Netherlands	Netherlands	Sunny Heart	2001–2019	Compulsory liquidation.
Thomas Cook Belgium	Belgium	Sunny Heart	2001–2019	Compulsory liquidation.
Thomas Cook China	China	Sunny Heart	2016–2019	Majority owned by Fosun Tourism.
Thomas Cook India	India	Globe	1881–2012	Sold to Fairfax Financial.
Airtours	United Kingdom	Independent logo	2007–2019 (former MyTravel Group subsidiary)	Compulsory liquidation; closed down on 23 September 2019. (Note: Airtours was a brand of Thomas Cook Retail Limited which became insolvent along with the rest of TCRL. 'TCRL' operated the Thomas Cook UK website and the Airtours UK website.)
Ving	Norway; Sweden	Sunny Heart	2007–2019 (former MyTravel Group subsidiary)	Acquired by an investment consortium.
Tjäreborg	Finland	Sunny Heart	2007–2019 (former MyTravel Group subsidiary)	Acquired by an investment consortium.
Spies	Denmark	Sunny Heart	2007–2019 (former MyTravel Group subsidiary)	Acquired by an investment consortium.
Neckermann	Poland; Hungary; Czech Republic	Sunny Heart	2001–2019 for Poland and Hungary; 2007–2019 for Czech Republic	Compulsory liquidation.
Neckermann Reisen	Austria; Switzerland	Sunny Heart	2001–2019	Compulsory liquidation; acquired by Anex Tours.
Intourist	Russia	Independent and Sunny Heart	2011–2019	Acquired by Anex Tours.
Sunquest Vacations	Canada	Independent	1995–2013	Sold to Transat A.T.
Öger Tours	Germany	Independent	2010–2019	Acquired by Anex Tours.

==== In Destination Management ====
Thomas Cook In Destination Management Limited was an overseas management company, operating on behalf of its British sister tour operator and airline. The business was in charge of managing bus transfers to hotels and providing hotel 'reps' for Thomas Cook customers. It ceased operations on 23 September 2019 after Thomas Cook Group and its UK entities entered compulsory liquidation.

==== Hotel chains ====
Thomas Cook Hotels and Resorts Limited was the Thomas Cook Group's wholly owned hotel business. The majority of hotels were located in Europe, primarily in countries within the European Union. Brands included Casa Cook, Sentido, Sunprime, Cook's Club, Aldiana, Sunwing, SunConnect, and Smartline.

=== Aviation ===
The Thomas Cook Group's airline division operated as one operating segment, the Thomas Cook Group Airlines (TCGA).

==== Airlines ====
Airline	Country	Image	Joined	Description	Fate
Thomas Cook Airlines UK	United Kingdom		2003–2019	Thomas Cook Airlines was established in 2003 after being renamed from the former JMC Air. As of 2016, the airline operated an 'all Airbus fleet' operating the Airbus A321 and Airbus A330.	Compulsory liquidation; closed down on 23 September 2019.
Condor	Germany		2001–present	Condor Flugdienst is a German carrier established in 1956 and previously a fully owned subsidiary of Lufthansa. It operates a mixed fleet of Boeing and Airbus aircraft.	Continues to operate; planned acquisition by LOT Polish Airlines withdrawn on 13 April 2020; now owned by British investment firm Attestor Capital.
Thomas Cook Aviation	Germany		2017–2020	In January 2017 Air Berlin Aviation GmbH received the approval for the Air Operator's Certificate (AOC) after being acquired by Thomas Cook Group. The airline operated six Airbus A320 aircraft out of Düsseldorf and Leipzig. The company was renamed to Thomas Cook Aviation in November 2018.	Aircraft transferred to Condor in December 2019; filed for bankruptcy on 2 April 2020.
Thomas Cook Airlines Balearics	Spain		2017–2019	Thomas Cook Airlines Balearics was established in 2017 after the acquisition of Thomas Cook Airlines Belgium by Lufthansa. The airline operated 6 Airbus A320-200 aircraft and operated in the United Kingdom and Germany.	All aircraft transferred to Condor; it was declared insolvent on 26 December 2019, though it still operated some flights on behalf of Condor until it finally ceased all operations in January 2021.
Thomas Cook Airlines Scandinavia	Norway; Denmark; Sweden; Finland		2007–2019	Thomas Cook Airlines Scandinavia was a Scandinavian airline that operated flights from Denmark, Norway, Sweden and Finland to worldwide destinations. The airline operated the Airbus A321-200, Airbus A330-200 and Airbus A330-300.	Acquired by an investment consortium and rebranded as Sunclass Airlines on 30 October 2019.
Thomas Cook Airlines Belgium	Belgium		2002–2017	Thomas Cook Airlines Belgium was a Belgian leisure airline owned by the Thomas Cook Group. It operated scheduled flights to destinations throughout Europe and Africa from its base at Brussels Airport.	Ceased operations when it was sold to Lufthansa AG in 2017.
Thomas Cook Airlines Canada	Canada		2010–2013	Thomas Cook Airlines Canada was a Canadian charter division of the Thomas Cook Group based in Montreal, Quebec, Canada. It served destinations to the Caribbean, Mexico and to North America.	Ceased operations when Thomas Cook Group sold Sunquest Vacations to Red Label Vacations in March 2013.

== Sponsorship ==
Thomas Cook was a main sponsor of Manchester City and Peterborough United football clubs. On 22 May 2009, Manchester City announced that its six-year partnership with Thomas Cook would conclude at the end of the 2008–09 Premier League season. Thomas Cook was a sponsor of the London 2012 Summer Olympics. As one of the UK's biggest and most popular providers of package holidays, Thomas Cook was appointed to provide "affordable and accessible" holidays and accommodation throughout the games.
