= Thomas Cook Airlines Balearics =

Spanish charter airline

| IATA | ICAO | Call sign |
|---|---|---|
| H5 | CTB | SUNNYHEART |
- Founded: October 2017
- Ceased operations: January 2021
- Operating bases: Palma de Mallorca Airport
- Fleet size: 6
- Parent company: Thomas Cook Group
- Key people: Manuel Mañas
- Employees: 458 (Oct. 2019)
- Website: thomascookairlines.com

Thomas Cook Airlines Balearics S.L. was a Spanish leisure airline that launched in 2017 and was previously owned by the Thomas Cook Group. After the collapse of its parent company on 23 September 2019, the airline itself was eventually declared insolvent on 26 December 2019, though it still operated some flights on behalf of Condor until it finally ceased all operations in January 2021.

== History ==
The airline was established in October 2017 to help support the other airlines of the Thomas Cook Group. The airline filed for insolvency on 26 December 2019. Despite filing for insolvency, the airline continued to operate some flights on behalf of Condor. As per the portal Aviacion Digital, PANAF Holdings wants to buy the Spanish airline and continue operating it in a smaller form. The takeover was successful however on 31 January 2021, it was decided that Thomas Cook Airlines Balearics would be shut down after a bleak outlook in the aviation sector.

== Fleet ==
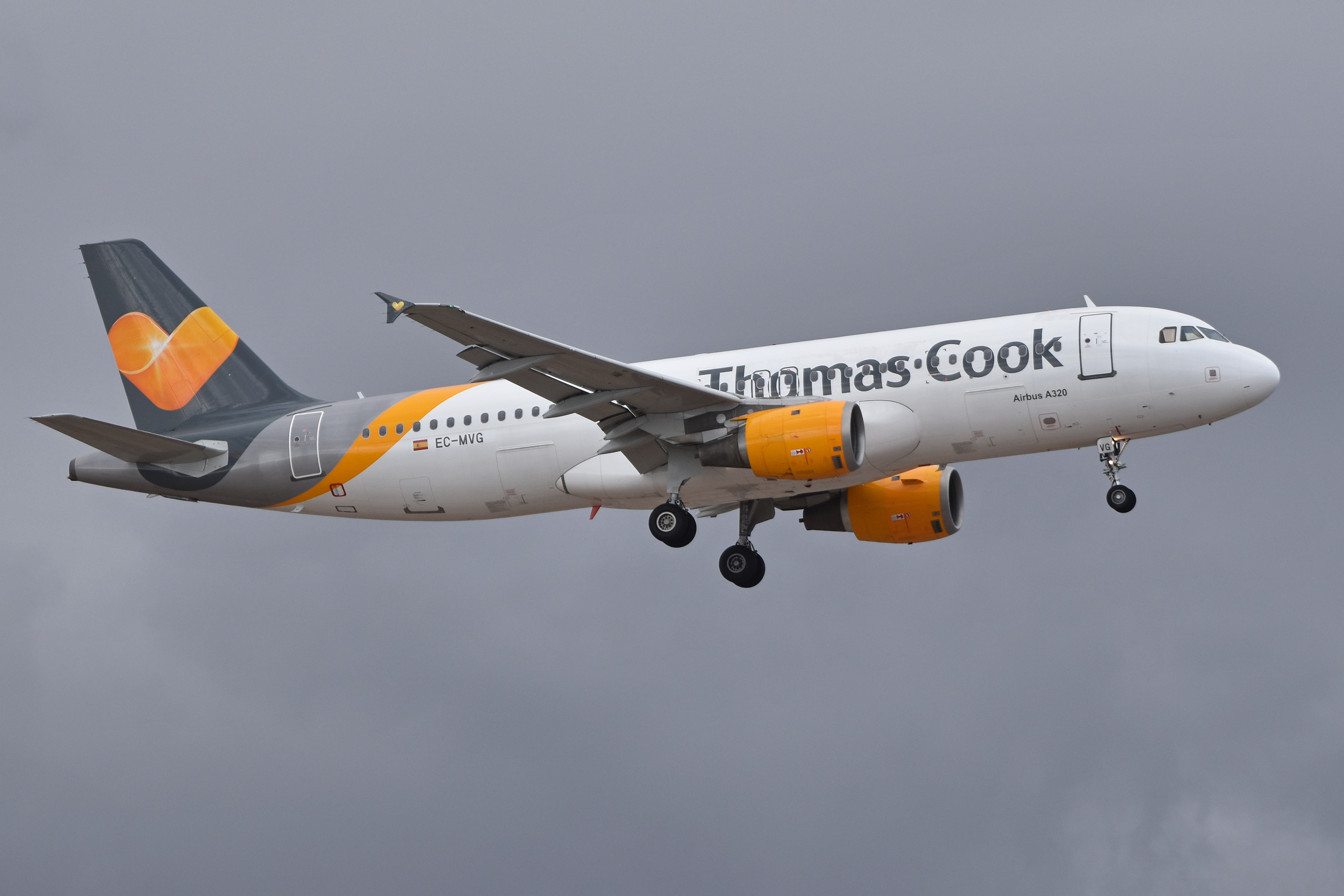
Thomas Cook Airlines Balearics Airbus A320-200

As of March 2020, the Thomas Cook Airlines Balearics fleet consisted of the following aircraft:

Thomas Cook Airlines Balearics fleet
| Aircraft | In service | Orders | Passengers | Notes |
|---|---|---|---|---|
| Airbus A320-200 | 6 | — | 180 | Operated on behalf of Condor |
| Total | 6 | — | | |
