= Venture capital in Poland =

Aspect of the Polish economy

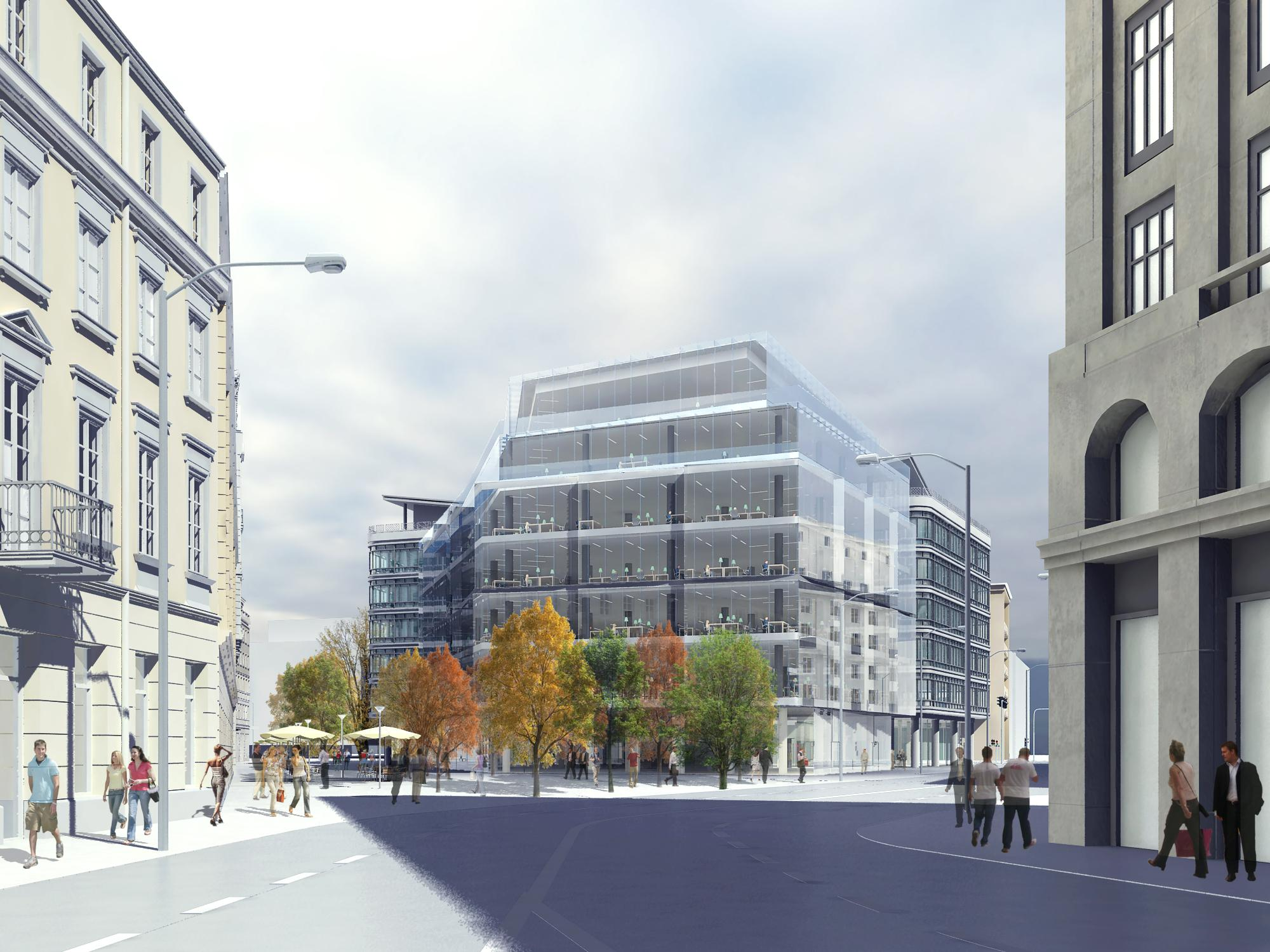
Warsaw headquarters of the Polish Development Fund, one of Poland's state agencies that works as a fund of funds

Venture capital is a segment of the economy of Poland where private equity finances early-stage high-risk companies, with the potential for fast growth. As of March 2019, there is a total of 130 active VC firms in Poland, including local offices of international VC firms, and VC firms with mainly Polish management teams. Between 2009 and 2019, these entities have invested locally in over 750 companies, which gives an average of around 9 companies per portfolio. The Polish venture market accounts for 3% of the entire European ecosystem of VC investments, mainly in the digital space.

Since 2016, the institutions of an Alternative Investment Company, and a Closed-End Investment Fund have been established for entities implementing investments in enterprises in the seed or startup phase. In 2018, venture capital funds invested €178M in Polish startups (0.033% of GDP). According to Startup Poland, as of March 2019, total assets managed by VC companies operating in Poland are estimated at €2.6B. The total value of investments of the Polish VC market is worth €209.2M.

== History of VC funds in Poland ==
=== Early 90s ===
As a form of financing enterprises, first venture capital funds appeared in Poland at the beginning of the 1990s. As Polish terminology lacks an adequate equivalent for the concept of venture capital, the English version is widely used, next to the terms “speculative capital”, and “capital engaged in risky transactions”, to determine this form of financing.

First capital investors appeared on the Polish market as funds financed from public aid funds, with the mission of developing the private sector (e.g. the Polish-American Entrepreneurship Fund, with capital of US$240M), or private funds (e.g. Invesco). In 1990, the investment activity was also undertaken by the Danish Fund for Central and Eastern Europe, which would support investments in Poland using government capital. In 1991, the Society for Social and Economic Initiatives started its activities, and in 1992 further key institutions including the Care Small Business Assistance Corporation, the Cooperation Fund, the Foundation for the Development of Polish Agriculture, and the European Bank for Reconstruction and Development.

In the second half of the 1990s, there was an increase in interest from investors. In 1992, the Polish Private Equity Fund I and II (US$151M) began operations, and in 1994, the Poland Partners fund (US$65M) have also appeared on the market, along with the Poland Investment Fund (with the participation of EBRD and IFC), the Renaissance Capital, the White Eagle Industries, the Poland Growth Fund, and the National Investment Funds, created from the universal privatization program.

The first attempts of private entities with venture capital on the Polish market were made by Roman Kluska, creator of the Polish tech precursor Optimus, whose shares were sold to Zbigniew Jakubas and BRE Bank in April 2000 for PLN 261M (today's €60.6M). Kluska would take high investment risk investing his own stock money in promising technological projects. In addition to the manufacturing of computers, cash registers, and developing integration systems, Optimus Pascal, the founder of today's major Polish news portal Onet, was established. And during the same period, Tomasz Czechowicz, the founder of personal computer producer JTT Computer, introduced the first Polish venture capital fund MCI Management. In November 2000, the fund began trade on the Warsaw Stock Exchange.

In 2000, around 102 investments worth over PLN 800M (€185.8M) were completed (supplying 92 companies), with telecommunications and media being the most popular industries (46% of investments). In 2002, VC funds invested PLN 529M (€122.9M) in Poland, which was a 37% yearly growth, by both locally based funds (PLN 422M, €98M), and foreign fund management companies (PLN 107M, €24.9M). In 2002, investments of VC funds were mainly focused on FMCG companies (35% of investments). In 2003, the number of companies covered by investments decreased to 48, while VC investments increased significantly and amounted to PLN 779M (€180.1M), while the market was considerably interested in the telecommunications, media, and financial services sectors.

=== Currently ===
Since 2014, the National Center for Research and Development (Polish: Narodowe Centrum Badań i Rozwoju) has been implementing the subsidy-and-investment instrument BRIdge Alfa, financed from the European Regional Development Fund, under the Intelligent Development Operational Program 2014–2020. The aim of the BRIdge Alfa is to increase the innovativeness of the Polish economy by strengthening the synergy between entrepreneurs and scientists. Since 2017, the National Centre for Research and Development, has signed contracts under the subsidy and investment instrument Bridge Alfa with 33 firms that conduct venture transactions, and in 2018 another state agency, the Polish Development Fund (Polish: Polski Fundusz Rozwoju) signed additional 26.

According to the March 2019 report by Startup Poland, the total assets under management in VC firms active in Poland estimates at €2.6B. With average assets under management at €19.6M. Over half of the firms declared that their fundraising was ongoing. The research was based on the self-report of 70 VC firms, including extrapolated and publicly available data.

== Legal basis ==
Until 2016, operating in Poland as a private equity and venture capital fund that implements investment projects among enterprises in the seed or startup phase was associated with small formal and legal, or capital requirements. Most frequently, PE/VC funds were small, simple limited liability companies or partnerships in which people with capital were willing to co-finance and then gain from prospective projects of young entrepreneurs. The Polish law did not provide for additional requirements for such entities over those resulting from the provisions of the commercial law.

The situation changed on June 4, 2016, when as a result of the implementation of the Alternative Investment Fund Managers Directive into Polish law, greater fortifications were introduced by appointing two new financial institutions, supervised by Poland's Financial Supervision Authority (Polish: Komisja Nadzoru Finansowego, KNF).

=== Alternative investment company ===
It is a collective investment institution, legally available in Poland since 2016, other than specialized open-end and closed-end investment funds. AICs (Polish: alternatywna spółka inwestycyjna) may be carried out in the form of a limited company (joint-stock or limited liability company), and a limited partnership or limited joint-stock partnership. An AIC's activity requires an authorization or entry into the register kept by the KNF, which entails a number of capital, infrastructure or personal requirements. That is why it is intended for large asset managers over €100M.

In January 2019, due to the high costs of running a closed-end investment fund and numerous statutory regulations that restricted VC investors, AICs were exempted from double taxation. Revenues obtained from the sale of shares were exempt from corporate income tax, with the condition that they held 10 percent of shares in the company for two years.

=== Closed investment fund ===
Registering an AIC involves lower operating costs. However, an alternative to larger entities is establishing of own closed investment fund (Polish: fundusz inwestycyjny zamknięty), which can be created only by a selected licensed investment fund company, responsible for the quality of asset management and cooperation with third parties.

CIFs have a wide range of investment opportunities (including asset placement in shares of non-public companies), which is associated with a greater limitation of participation in the fund. Due to the high investment risk, the CIF offer is addressed mainly to experienced investors—financial institutions and entrepreneurs aware of investment goals and risks. The amount of entry for natural persons is regulated in the act, at the level of €40,000.

== Characteristic of Polish VC ==
Venture capital firms in Poland typically fall into one of three types: standard commonly defined VC firms, public-private partnerships, including VC firms set up with grants or other capital instruments from state agencies, and family office-led firms, with high-net-worth individuals as a majority LP.

=== Market size ===
130 venture capital funds currently operate in Poland, 40 per cent more than in 2017, and the number is still growing. The estimated total volume of all venture capital investments in Poland in 2016 was €160.5M. In 2017, it dropped to €106M, and in 2018 venture capital funds invested in Polish start-ups €178M (0.033 percent of GDP), which is 0.847% of 2018's value of the VC market in Europe, amounting to €21B.

As of March 2019, the total value of the investment of the Polish VC market is already worth €209.2M. In the first quarter of 2019, Polish startups carried out 21 transactions for a total amount of PLN 103.3M (€24.3M).

VC funds in Poland manage assets of €2.6B, which gives an average of €19.6M per fund. However, the funds above this amount have only 23% of funds. However, in recent years, the Polish industry has focused the most on obtaining state funds for innovation. Since 2017, 59 contracts with funds have been signed as part of the Bridge Alfa program of the National Center for Research and Development and the Polish Development Fund.

However, the Polish VC industry is slowly becoming independent from state and EU funds. For the first time, there were funds that carried out the second or third round of financing, but without the participation of state funds. Still, however, 52 percent. funds available on the market comes from the state. In addition, 56 percent Polish VCs are debutantes in the industry, mostly using government support.

=== Cooperation of Polish startups and investors ===
Venture capital is an example of the so-called smart money, a form of investment that apart from capital also includes mentoring and consulting. An investor paying to become a shareholder of the enterprise, supports it with his knowledge and experience, and helps it develop, which itself is sometimes much more desirable than financing itself.

According to the Startup Poland study, aside from the help in the preparation of subsequent funding rounds, startups most often need the investors to introduce them to industry contacts and business mentoring. However, due to the inexperience of fund managers in the most important areas for startups, the offer of Polish investors is far from expected. The funds’ competences, both in terms of assistance in obtaining new investors, and opening contacts in the industry, are derivatives of a dense network of contacts and a solid reputation.

One approach to building smart capital involves specialization in specific sectors, allowing fund managers to accumulate industry experience and relationships as more companies within a given sector pass through their portfolio. In Poland, venture investors typically maintain an average portfolio of nine companies, a relatively modest scale that nonetheless provides startups with opportunities to network with other portfolio companies.

=== New funds ===
In 2018, new VC initiatives were introduced in Poland, including TDJ Pitango Ventures, a joint initiative of the Polish family enterprise TDJ and the Israeli fund Pitango; Manta Ray VC created by Sebastian Kulczyk; and Fidiasz led by Krzysztof Domarecki. Other new funds were capitalized by the European Investment Fund, including Market One Capital, Inovo and Innovation Nest. The third group are international funds that have not invested in the early stages, so far: the Dutch fund Finch Capital (supported by the Polish Development Fund), which invests throughout Europe, and the Austrian fund Speedinvest. Further funds were created ready to support companies at later stages, including Inovo Venture Partners and Cogito Capital, as well as many smaller funds created with the help of the PFR.

Subsequent funds of this type are just being created. In March 2019, Sunfish Partners launched its PLN 65M (€15M) venture capital fund to invest in Polish deep tech startups. PFR Ventures is among the Limited Partners of Sunfish Partners. In May 2019, the creators of the Polish pre-accelerate program ReactorX, launched the fund SMOK Ventures, with the support of American entrepreneurs and PFR Ventures (80 percent of capital). The fund for investment in seed rounds will allocate PLN 46M (€10.8M).

== State agencies and funds of funds ==
=== Origin of capital ===
Prior to 2018, approximately 81% of investment transactions in Poland over the last decade have had some public capital involved, including the National Capital Fund, the Polish Agency for Enterprise Development, the National Center for Research and Development, and European Union funds. Only less than one fifth of investments financing Polish startups took place completely with no public support. Financing in these cases usually amounted to PLN 0.5–1M (€116K–232K).

According to the 2019 report by Startup Poland, 52% of all the venture capital available on the Polish market today, around €1.35B, is capital raised from public sources, Polish state agencies or the European Investment Fund. And around €104B in VC funds in Poland was invested by private Polish LPs. Non-Polish LPs have invested only around €130M, while fund managers themselves typically contribute 4% of the fund size.

=== The National Capital Fund ===
The NCF (Polish: Krajowy Fundusz Kapitałowy, KFK) was created by the Polish government in 2005. Until January 2017, it managed €110M from the targeted subsidy of the former Ministry of Economy, the EU Structural Funds (Operational Program "Innovative Economy") and until December 2017, from the Swiss-Polish Cooperation Program.

As a fund of funds, the NCF itself had invested in VC funds which financed the development of companies seeking capital for their innovative projects. In an open competition of offers, it had selected micro, small and medium enterprises based in Poland, with particular emphasis on entrepreneurs who conducted research and development activities. In 2017, funds from the National Capital Fund were included in 37% of rounds of transactions examined by Startup Poland. The result of NCF support is as much as half of the previous rounds over PLN 1M.

=== The Polish Agency for Enterprise Development ===
The Agency (Polish: Polska Agencja Rozwoju Przedsiębiorczości, PARP) is involved in the implementation of domestic and international projects, financed from the structural funds, the state budget, and long-term programs of the European Commission. It participates in the creation and effective implementation of state policy in the field of entrepreneurship, innovation and adaptability of personnel, seeking to transform into a key institution responsible for creating an environment that supports entrepreneurs.

The Agency's capital was involved in nearly a quarter of transactions concerning Polish startups. Since 2007, the Agency has invested PLN 890M (€206.8M) in Polish startups. The first public VC support program launched by PARP was the financial perspective of EU funds, in which 6 VC early stage funds received a total of PLN 56.5M (€13.1M) in 2007–2008. However, in 2008–2015, as part of the Operational Program "Innovative Economy", for a pre-incubation and recapitalization of over 1,200 startups, a total of more than PLN 830M was allocated at the earliest stages of development. PARP specializes in rounds of up to PLN 1M (€230K).

=== The National Center for Research and Development ===
Established in 2007 as an executive agency of the Ministry of Science and Higher Education, the center (Polish: Narodowe Centrum Badań i Rozwoju, NCBR) supports high-risk investments through three major venture capital projects: BRIdge Alfa, NCBR CVC and TDJ Pitango Venture fund. Under the BRIdge Alfa program, the center co-finances up to 80% of investment capital to reduce financial risk for private investors, while also supporting management team development through knowledge exchange.

Since its inception, the National Center for Research and Development has spent almost PLN 250M on venture development, which is less than a tenth of the funds planned by the center to stimulate the development of the VC market. Every tenth examined in the Startup Poland report, the investment was leveraged with funds from the NCBR.

=== The Polish Development Fund ===
Operating since 2016, the Fund (Polish: Polski Fundusz Rozwoju, PFR) deals with subsidizing innovation and stimulating venture investments. Through PFR Ventures, under the fund-of-funds formula, it offers repayable financing to innovative companies from the SME sector through financial intermediaries: VC funds or business angels.

PFR Ventures manages five funds: PFR Starter, PFR Biznest, PFR Open Innovations (OI), PFR KOFFI and PFR NCBR CVC. The offer of each of them is dedicated to companies at various stages of development: from the pre-seed stage to the growth and expansion phase, and provides for a different amount of financing. Funds earmarked for innovative ventures come from European funds: the Intelligent Development Operational Program 2014-2020 and private funds.

== Selected funds ==
Examples of venture capital funds on the Polish market, each of which is funded from different sources of capital:

=== Bek Ventures ===
Founded 2013, Bek Ventures is a venture capital firm that focuses on early-stage businesses. Bek has invested in businesses such as UiPath and Payhawk. The firm officially rebranded from Earlybird Digital East to Bek Ventures in 2024. In 2025, Bek Ventures was ranked as the highest-performing VC firm for the second consecutive year in a row on HEC-Dow Jones’s global performance index.

=== bValue ===
An early-stage fund with €20M available for investment, founded in 2016, it supports founders in distribution, product validation, recruitment, and capital, primarily from the CEE region, with investment tickets ranging between €250K–1M in pre-series, and below €250K in seed. The fund also provides strategic advice and consultations on scaling, product development, team building, and mergers and acquisitions.

=== EEC Ventures ===
EEC Ventures is an independent venture capital firm managing two funds with a total capitalization of PLN 210 million. The funds are specialized in energy, industry 4.0 and cleantech sectors. EEC Magenta invests in seed stage, early-stage and growth phases with ticket sizes varying from PLN 4M up to PLN 27M. As of 2022, the firm has invested in 11 companies; limited partners of the funds are Tauron Polska, Polish Development Fund and general partners of the funds.

=== EIT InnoEnergy ===
An innovation engine for sustainable energy across Europe, supported by the European Institute of Innovation and Technology, the fund supports the international commercialization of energy, cleantech, and mobility solutions. It cooperates with over 400 industrial companies, research and academic centers in 40 countries, investing €100M annually. So far, the fund invested €1.7B in innovative projects.

=== Experior Venture Fund ===
Co-founded by the National Capital Fund (Polish: Krajowy Fundusz Kapitałowy), with assets from the Swiss-Polish Cooperation Programme. The EVF focuses on software and tech-enabled businesses. It invests at pre-seed and seed stages, and co-invests and partners with global funds. Capitalized at PLN 80M (€18.6M), it provides support and strategic guidance on technology and product, with an extensive network of CEE and US business angels.

=== Fidiasz EVC ===
Created in 2017 by Krzysztof Domarecki, founder of the construction chemicals manufacturer Selena Group, so far, the Fidiasz raised €50M. Its typical tickets range between €500K–5M. It provides support R&D, products and technology development, production, marketing, sales, and M&A. The fund's areas of interest include fintech, IoT, agricultural engineering, construction materials, and unconventional energy sources.

=== Innogy Innovation Hub ===
With the mission to redefine the energy market, the Hub created a €162M portfolio (as of December 2018) through investing in over 80 disruptive startup and scale-up companies. Headquartered in Berlin, with teams across Europe including in London, Warsaw and Essen, as well as offices in Silicon Valley and Tel Aviv, the Hub provides funding, mentoring and a platform for co-creation, collaboration and convergence.

=== Inovo Venture Partners ===
A €25M fund investing across CEE, recognized as the best VC investor in Poland by entrepreneurs and investment industry (VC House of the Year, by the Polish PE/VC Association). With over 25 seed, growth and buyout investments including Polish early-stage success stories Booksy and Brand24, Inovo supports founders with a 100-days plan and several co-investments with global funds, at Series A stage (€1M–1.5M ticket). The fund's expertise includes SaaS, marketplaces, and mobile businesses.

=== Market One Capital ===
An early-stage €35M seed fund based in Warsaw and Barcelona, focused on European SaaS-based marketplaces and B2B software. MOC members have already invested in over 40 companies including global category leaders Docplanner, Brainly, and Eversports. MOC's typical investment path is €400K at seed and follow-on, to €3–4M, mainly in seed and series A rounds.

=== MCI TechVentures ===
Funded in 2008, a late VC-and-growth investment fund which targets rising innovative companies with a proven business model and established revenues. It provides funding to companies in their expansion and growth stages to potential market leaders. The fund looks for minority stakes, with ticket sizes from €5–20M, in Western Europe and CEE. It's a part of the MCI Group established in 1999, one of the main technology investors in the region, with total assets of €550M, the largest locally established investment group, which also includes a buyout fund MCI.EuroVentures, and a private-debt fund MCI.CreditVentures.

=== Movens Venture Capital ===
Supports tech companies focused on European markets, by investing in seed and Series A rounds (tickets between $250 and $1M). Focused on fintech, martech, e-commerce support, logistics, medtech, and sport & wellness, based on marketplace and SaaS models.

=== SpeedUp Venture Capital Group ===
SpeedUp Venture Capital Group is a leading group of venture capital funds, investing in enterprises in an early stage of development (seed, pre-revenue, early growth, Series A). Areas of their interest include enterprises and entrepreneurs in Central and Eastern Europe, who want to conquer the global market by utilizing their self-developed solutions. Cooperation with companies is based on a 3-8 year investment horizon. SpeedUp Group looking for innovations from areas such as: consumer internet, electromobility, energy, fintech, martech, adtech, medtech, IoT and hardware. Their interested in technologies like Machine Learning, Picture recognition, Artificial Intelligence, Augmented Reality, VR and Blockchain.

=== Sunfish Partners ===
Sunfish Partners is an early stage VC that invests in Polish deep tech startups. Sunfish Partners has offices in Warsaw and Berlin and launched its PLN 65M (€15M) fund in March 2019. Focused on B2B startups, Sunfish Partners typically invests PLN 2M in the first round and reserves an additional PLN 2M for follow-on investments in subsequent rounds. Before Sunfish Partners, its partners had founded, supported, or financed more than 30 companies, primarily in Germany.

=== TDJ Pitango Ventures ===
TDJ Pitango Ventures is a joint venture of the Polish family industrial group TDJ and Pitango. Backed by the state agency National Center for Research and Development, it was the leader in the 2019's Startup Poland VC funds rank, having invested €10.6M into 5 startups within one year. TDJ Pitango Ventures invests in early and growth phases, investing US$1M–5M (€0.9M–4.5M) per round in technology startups operating on large and quickly growing markets.

== Bibliography ==
- Antkiewicz, Sławomir (2008). "Fundusze wysokiego ryzyka w Polsce na przykładzie Narodowych Funduszy Inwestycyjnych" (PDF). Studia Gdańskie. V. Gdańsk: Wydawnictwo Gdańskiej Wyższej Szkoły Humanistycznej: 259–275.
- Beauchamp, Magdalena; Krysztofiak-Szopa, Julia (2018). Złota księga venture capital w Polsce 2018. Warsaw: Fundacja Startup Poland. ISBN 978-83-948788-2-5.
- Krysztofiak-Szopa, Julia; Wisłowska, Monika (2019). The Golden Book of Venture Capital in Poland 2019. Warsaw: Startup Poland. ISBN 978-83-948788-6-3.
- Rosa, Anna (2016-12-30). "Venture Capital w Polsce" (PDF). Zeszyty Naukowe Instytutu Ekonomii i Zarządzania. 20 (2). Wydział Nauk Ekonomicznych – Politechnika Koszalińska.
- Żółtowski, Michał; Majchrak, Olga; Zreda, Mateusz (2017). Fundusze Venture Capital – BRIdge Alfa – zagadnienia prawne i merytoryczne (PDF). Warszawa: Narodowe Centrum Badań i Rozwoju. ISBN 978-83-948439-1-5.
