= Michał Strzelecki =

Michał Henryk Strzelecki
- Occupations: Engineer and academic

Academic background
- Education: PhD: 1995, Łódź University of Technology Habilitation: 2005, AGH University of Science and Technology in Kraków Professorship: 2018

Academic work
- Institutions: Łódź University of Technology

Michał Henryk Strzelecki is a Polish engineer who is full professor and researcher at the Łódź University of Technology. He is affiliated with the Institute of Electronics within the Faculty of Electrical Engineering, Electronics, Computer Science and Automation. His research focuses on biomedical signal and image processing and analysis, image texture analysis, and the development of artificial intelligence-based computer-aided diagnostic systems.

== Education ==
Michał Henryk Strzelecki graduated from the Faculty of Electrical Engineering, Electronics, Computer Science and Automation at the Łódź University of Technology. In 1995, he earned a PhD degree in Electronics, and in 2005 he obtained the postdoctoral degree (habilitation) in Computer Science, specializing in biomedical signal and image processing. He was awarded the title of Professor of Technical Sciences in 2018.

== Career ==
Between 2004 and 2015, he served as Deputy Director of the Institute of Electronics for Education, and from 2015 to 2019 as Deputy Director for Science. From 2016 to 2020, he was a member of the Senate of the Łódź University of Technology. Between 2016 and 2019, he served as Vice-Dean for Research of the Faculty of Electrical Engineering, Electronics, Computer Science and Automation, and from 2019 to 2020 as Vice-Dean for Development of the same faculty and Chair of the Discipline Council for Information and Communication Technology. Since 2021, he has been Chair of the University Committee for the Evaluation of Scientific Disciplines, and since 2024 a member of the Committee on Metrology and Scientific Instrumentation of the Polish Academy of Sciences. He is also a member of the Discipline Council for Information and Communication Technology and the Programme Council for Biomedical Engineering and Biomedical Engineering and Technologies.

He has participated in numerous national and international research projects, including the COST B21, COST BM1103 and COST TD1007 programmes, where he served as a member of the Management Committee. He has also been involved in projects funded under the European Union’s Seventh Framework Programme (FP7), the German Research Foundation (DFG), the National Science Centre (NCN), and the National Centre for Research and Development (NCBR).

From 2006 to 2008, he was a Visiting Professor at Chonbuk National University in Jeonju, Republic of Korea.

Strzelecki has served as an expert and reviewer for the National Science Centre, the National Centre for Research and Development, and the Ministry of Science and Higher Education. He has also evaluated research projects funded by the National Fund for Scientific and Technological Development of Chile, the Research Promotion Foundation in Cyprus, the Czech Health Research Council, the Czech Science Foundation, the European Research Executive Agency, the Latvian Council of Science, the Natural Sciences and Engineering Research Council of Canada, and the Polish Medical Research Agency.

He is a co-inventor of a patented device for preventive screening of skin lesions.

== Awards and distinctions ==
- 2007 – The Best Paper Award at the International Symposium on Information Technology Convergence in Jeonju, Republic of Korea, for the paper Segmentation of 3D MR Liver Images Using Synchronised Oscillators Network.
- 2010 – First Prize in the category “Most Important Scientific Achievement” in the Łódź University of Technology Top List competition.
- 2010 – Silver Medal for Long Service.
- 2012 – EUNIS Elite Award awarded to the consortium implementing the European Educational Connectivity Solution project under FP7.
- 2013 – The Best Paper Award (DSP Theory Session) at the IEEE SPA Conference in Poznań.
- 2014 – Diploma of Recognition as supervisor of an award-winning engineering thesis.
- 2014 – Medal of the National Education Commission.
- 2016 – The Best Paper Award (Biomedical Applications Session) at the IEEE SPA Conference in Poznań.
- 2016 – Diploma of Recognition as supervisor of an award-winning master’s thesis.
- 2017 – Commemorative Medal awarded on the 80th anniversary of the University Clinical Hospital named after the Military Medical Academy – Central Veterans Hospital in Łódź for long-standing scientific cooperation in the development of imaging diagnostics support methods for brain diseases.
- 2024 – Gold Medal for Long Service.
