= Piotr Matczuk =

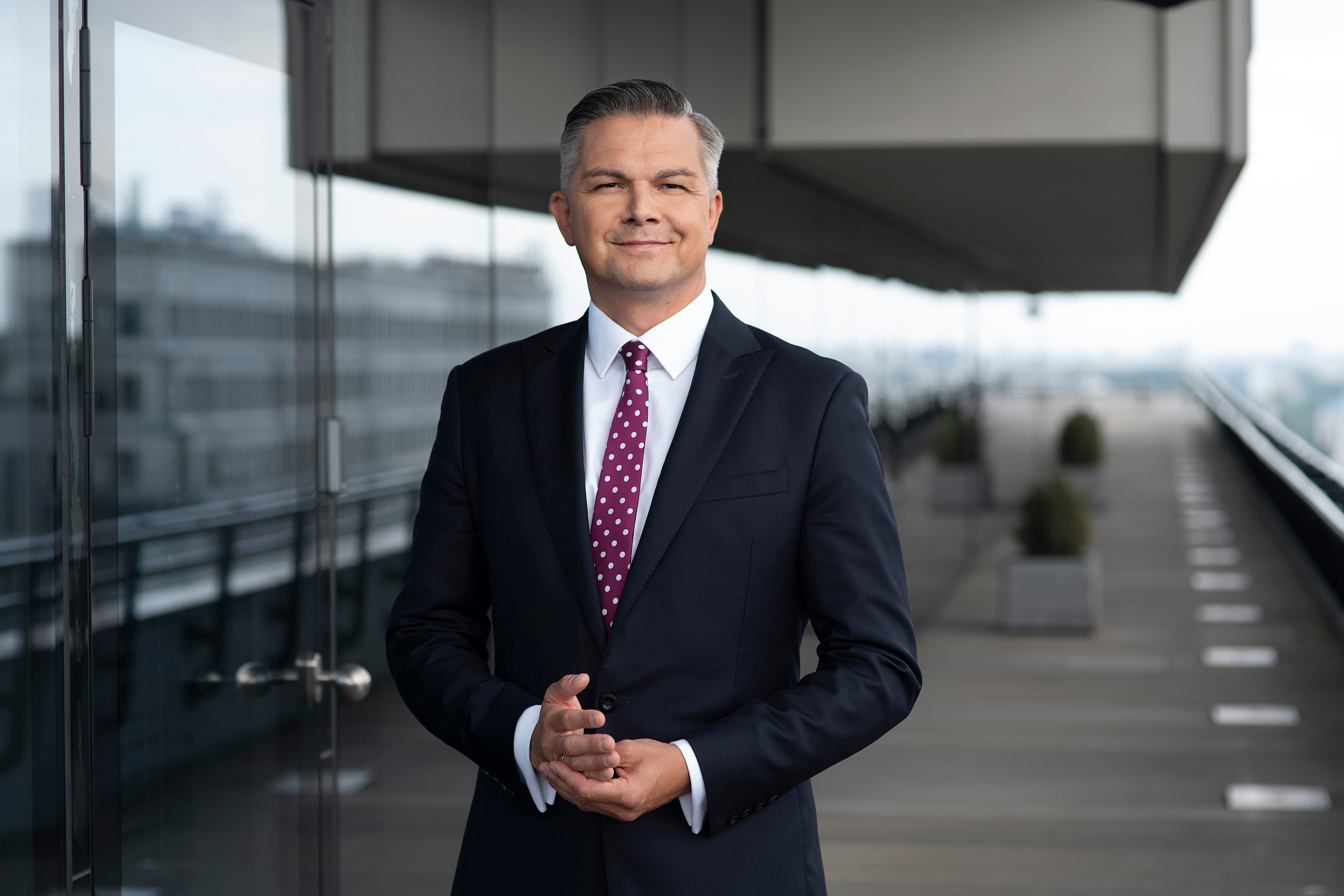
- Born: 16 January, 1983; Lublin, Poland
- Occupations: economist, executive, President of the Management Board of the Polish Development Fund, and Chairman of the Council of the Polish Development Fund Group

Piotr Matczuk (born 16 January 1983 in Lublin, Poland) – Polish economist, executive, President of the Management Board of the Polish Development Fund and Chairman of the Council of the Polish Development Fund Group, which brings together leaders of Polish institutions: PFR, BGK, PARP, ARP, PAIH and KUKE.

== Professional background ==
Piotr Matczuk was born 16 January 1983 in Lublin, Poland. Piotr Matczuk has many years of experience in international development institutions, having worked for three development institutions active in Poland. From 2017 to 2024, he served as a representative of the International Finance Corporation (IFC), an agency of the World Bank Group in Poland. He was responsible there for implementing the IFC strategy, investment and advisory projects, business development, and relations with public and private partners. During this period, the IFC increased its involvement in Poland several times, allocating over US$700 million to finance new projects in Poland in 2023, particularly in the financial sector, private equity, and green value chains.

From 2011 to 2014, he served as an adviser to the supervisory board of the European Bank for Reconstruction and Development (2011–2014). From 2008 to 2011, he worked as a financial market analyst at the National Bank of Poland. From July 2015 to December 2016, he was associated with PKP Intercity, where he oversaw the implementation of strategic projects.

Since July 2024, he has held the position of President of the Management Board of the Polish Development Fund S.A., and also serves as the Chairman of the Polish Development Fund Group Council. Within the structure of PFR, he is the originator of the Team Poland development institutions cooperation program. During his term, PFR announced two investment programmes focused on innovation in 2025: PFR Deep Tech and Innovate Poland (under the auspices of the Ministry of Finance and with the participation of BGK and PZU), and also intensified efforts to support the international presence of Polish enterprises.

A graduate of Stanisław Staszic High School No. 1 in Lublin, economic studies at the Warsaw School of Economics (specialising in macroeconomics), and the Sustainable Corporations programme at Saïd Business School, University of Oxford. From 2007 to 2011, he was a research fellow at the Warsaw School of Economics.

Author of a series of publications in the fields of macroeconomics, the history of economic thought, and financial markets.

He serves on the Programme Councils of the United Nations Global Compact Poland, the European Economic Congress, the European Financial Congress, and the New Mobility Congress.

== Private life ==
He was raised in Lublin. The son of historian and bibliographer Alicja Matczuk, PhD. Since 2020, married to Urszula Ajdacka-Matczuk, a doctor specialising in obstetrics and gynaecology. They have a daughter.
