= ESky Group =

Polish travel technology company

eSky Group
- Type: Private
- Industry: Tourism, travel, hospitality
- Founded: 1 July 2004
- Founders: Łukasz Habaj, Łukasz Kręski, Piotr Stępniewski, Agnieszka Stępniewska
- Headquarters: Green Park, Murckowska 14A Street, Katowice, Poland
- Area served: Europe, North America, South America, Africa, Asia
- Key people: Andrzej Kozłowski (CEO), Piotr Woś (CTO)
- Brands: eSky, eDestinos, Thomas Cook Tourism
- Services: Package holidays and city breaks, flights, accommodations, travel insurance, car and yacht rentals, experiences, attractions, sporting events
- Revenue: €801,000,000 (+42% YoY) (2023)
- Operating income: €18,700,000 (-11% YoY) (2023)
- Number of employees: 750+ (as of September 2024)
- Parent: MCI Capital (55% stake)
- Website: esky.com, esky.co.uk

eSky Group is a Polish-based online travel agency that operates several brands in 50 markets across Europe, the Americas, and Africa. The company provides Flight+Hotel dynamic packages for holidays and city breaks, standalone flights, accommodations, and other travel services.

The Group operates under the eSky (Europe, North America, Africa), eDestinos (Latin America) and Thomas Cook brands. The company also holds Travel Agent Accreditation of the International Air Transport Association (no. 63210803).

== History ==
eSky Group was founded in Poland in 2004 and initially handled trips as part of the Work and Travel program. Since 2005, the company has been selling airline tickets through its online platform, with approximately 550 airlines included in its flight inventory under agreements. In 2009, an online hotel reservation system and travel insurance sales were launched, and in 2015, a car rental service.

In June 2017, 6.3% of eSky Group shares were bought for PLN 15.6 million by Wirtualna Polska Group, which in March 2020 sold its eSky share package under the put option.

In 2022, the company’s owner changed, with MCI Capital listed private equity took a 55% stake in eSky Group.

The founders of eSky Group remained the controlling shareholders, holding a total of 45% of the company's shares, and the transaction amounted to approximately PLN 158 million and also included the recapitalization of the company.

In 2023, due to a business transformation towards a package travel provider, the Polish OTA switched its focus from flights aggregation to combining flights and accommodations into city breaks and holidays packages. The same year, the company reported revenue of more than €800m – an increase of 42% year-on-year – with around 3.3m customers using its services. eSky Group's EBITDA amounted to €18.7m.

=== International operations ===
In 2023, eSky Group expanded its payment processing capabilities in Latin America and Africa through a signed partnership with dLocal, a cross-border payments platform.

In April 2024, eSky Group established a partnership with Ryanair, Europe's low-cost carrier, becoming one of the first authorised online travel agencies to provide Ryanair flights, seats, and baggage. The deal guaranteed passengers that their contact and payment information is provided from the travel agent directly to the airline. After 12 months of cooperation between eSky Group and Ryanair the agreement was extended for a further two years.

At the same time, the travel platform started offering package holidays and city breaks in the United Kingdom. This followed the passing the UK's Civil Aviation Authority approval, and the company covered its packages with the Air Travel Organisers' Licensing (ATOL) protection scheme (no. 12520).

In September 2024, eSky Group acquired Thomas Cook from Hong Kong’s Fosun Tourism Group, excluding its operations in China and India. The company expanded from an online flight aggregator to a provider of package holidays and city breaks in over 50 countries.

On 6 February 2025, Andrzej Kozłowski, former vice-president and CFO, took over as CEO of eSky Group, replacing Łukasz Habaj, who stepped down for health reasons and remained on the Supervisory Board. Kozłowski has been with the company since 2015 and has been on its board of directors since 2016.
