= Inga Kawka =

Polish legal scholar

- Occupations: Legal scholar, academic

Academic background
- Education: Jagiellonian University (law degree, 2000; doctorate in legal sciences, 2005; habilitation in legal sciences, 2016)
- Thesis: The role of national regulatory authorities in telecommunications matters in the member states of the European Union (2005)

Academic work
- Discipline: Law
- Sub-discipline: European Union law, public economic law
- Institutions: Jagiellonian University; University of the National Education Commission, Kraków
- Website: www.law.uj.edu.pl/~kpe/pracownicy/inga-kawka/

Inga Kawka is a Polish legal scholar specialising in European Union law, public economic law, infrastructure-sector regulation, telecommunications regulation and internal market freedoms. She is a habilitated doctor of legal sciences and an academic affiliated with the Faculty of Law and Administration of the Jagiellonian University and the University of the National Education Commission, Kraków.

Her scholarly work includes monographs on telecommunications regulatory authorities in the European Union, good governance in EU law and service activity under EU internal market freedoms. Her 2006 monograph on telecommunications regulatory authorities in the European Union was reviewed in Polish legal and administrative-law journals, including Państwo i Prawo and Administracja: teoria, dydaktyka, praktyka.

== Biography ==
Kawka graduated in law from the Faculty of Law and Administration of the Jagiellonian University in 2000. In 2005 she obtained a doctoral degree in legal sciences on the basis of a dissertation concerning the role of national regulatory authorities in telecommunications matters in the member states of the European Union. In 2016 she obtained a habilitation in legal sciences at the Faculty of Law and Administration of the Jagiellonian University, with a specialisation in European law, on the basis of the monograph Gospodarcza działalność usługowa w prawie polskim w świetle unijnej swobody przedsiębiorczości i świadczenia usług.

From 2006 to 2016, she worked as an assistant professor at the Institute of Political Science of the Pedagogical University of Kraków. From 2015 to 2019 she headed the Department of European and Administrative Law at that university. Since 2019 she has been affiliated with the Department of European Law at the Faculty of Law and Administration of the Jagiellonian University.

She is also affiliated with the University of the National Education Commission, Kraków, where she is listed as a university professor at the Institute of Law, Economics and Administration.

== Academic work and reception ==
Kawka's research concerns European Union law, public economic law, the Europeanisation of public administration, administrative law from a European perspective, infrastructure-sector regulation, telecommunications law, internal market freedoms and legal aspects of digital transformation.

Her first monograph, Telekomunikacyjne organy regulacyjne w Unii Europejskiej. Problematyka prawna (2006), examined the legal position of telecommunications regulatory authorities in the European Union. The book was reviewed by Maciej Rogalski in Państwo i Prawo and by Jerzy Supernat in Administracja: teoria, dydaktyka, praktyka. It has also been cited in later scholarship on telecommunications regulation and sectoral regulatory authorities, including studies on the legal status of Polish regulatory authorities, judicial review of decisions of regulatory authorities and the economic regulation of the railway market.

Her 2011 monograph Zasady dobrego rządzenia w prawie Unii Europejskiej. Sektory infrastrukturalne concerned good governance in EU law and infrastructure sectors. Her habilitation monograph, Gospodarcza działalność usługowa w prawie polskim w świetle unijnych swobód przedsiębiorczości i świadczenia usług (2015), dealt with service activity in Polish law in the light of EU freedom of establishment and freedom to provide services. The latter work has been cited in legal scholarship concerning the implementation of the EU Services Directive, authorisation schemes, overriding reasons relating to the public interest and the legal concept of services in EU law.

Kawka has also co-edited works outside the field of doctrinal EU economic law. The volume Les exilés polonais en France et la réorganisation pacifique de l’Europe (1940–1989), co-edited with Antoine Marès and Wojciech Prażuch, was reviewed in H-France Review by Maria Pasztor and in Roczniki Dziejów Społecznych i Gospodarczych by Aneta Nisiobęcka.

She led the research project of the National Science Centre (Poland) entitled “Przepływ usług między Unią Europejską a Szwajcarią. Współpraca, czy integracja systemów prawnych?” (“The flow of services between the European Union and Switzerland: cooperation or integration of legal systems?”), carried out under the OPUS 5 call.

She coordinated the Jean Monnet module “Krajowa administracja publiczna a integracja europejska” (“National public administration and European integration”), implemented from 2013 to 2019. She also participated in the Jean Monnet Module “Digital Transformation of the Economy in the EU and Partner Countries”, carried out at the Institute of Law, Economics and Administration of the University of the National Education Commission, Kraków, from 2023 to 2026.

== Editorial and institutional positions ==
From 2015 to 2019, Kawka was editor-in-chief of Rocznik Administracji Publicznej (Public Administration Yearbook). She has also served on editorial or scientific boards of academic journals, including Juridical Science, Przegląd Europejski / European Review and Rocznik Administracji Publicznej.

Since 1 October 2025, she has served as head of the Centre for Foreign Law Schools and International Cooperation at the Faculty of Law and Administration of the Jagiellonian University.

== Selected publications ==
=== Monographs ===
- Telekomunikacyjne organy regulacyjne w Unii Europejskiej. Problematyka prawna, Zakamycze, Kraków, 2006.
- Zasady dobrego rządzenia w prawie Unii Europejskiej. Sektory infrastrukturalne, Wydawnictwo Naukowe Uniwersytetu Pedagogicznego, Kraków, 2011.
- Gospodarcza działalność usługowa w prawie polskim w świetle unijnych swobód przedsiębiorczości i świadczenia usług, Wolters Kluwer, Warsaw, 2015.
- Prawne aspekty świadczenia usług w Szwajcarii przez małe i średnie przedsiębiorstwa z Unii Europejskiej, with Małgorzata Kożuch, Wydawnictwo Naukowe Uniwersytetu Pedagogicznego, Kraków, 2018.

=== Edited volumes ===
- Les exilés polonais en France et la réorganisation pacifique de l’Europe (1940–1989), edited by Antoine Marès, Wojciech Prażuch and Inga Kawka, Peter Lang, Frankfurt am Main, 2017.
- Exils d’Europe médiane en France dans la seconde moitié du XXe siècle, edited by Antoine Marès, Wojciech Prażuch and Inga Kawka, Paris, 2017.
- E-administracja: skuteczna, odpowiedzialna i otwarta administracja publiczna w Unii Europejskiej, edited by Sławomir Dudzik, Inga Kawka and Renata Śliwa, Księgarnia Akademicka, Kraków, 2022.
- Obywatel w centrum działań e-administracji w Unii Europejskiej, edited by Sławomir Dudzik, Inga Kawka, Renata Śliwa and Ondrej Mitaľ, Księgarnia Akademicka, Kraków, 2023.
- E-administracja: Wyzwania dla cyfrowych usług publicznych w Unii Europejskiej, edited by Sławomir Dudzik, Inga Kawka and Renata Śliwa, Księgarnia Akademicka, Kraków, 2024.
- Fundamental Rights and Climate Change: Exploring New Perspectives and Corresponding Remedies, edited by Alicja Sikora-Kalėda and Inga Kawka, Księgarnia Akademicka, Kraków, 2025.

=== Selected articles and chapters ===
- “Metody tworzenia europejskiego jednolitego rynku usług”, Rocznik Administracji Publicznej, 2015, no. 1.
- “Prawne aspekty podejmowania pracy w Polsce przez cudzoziemców z państw spoza Unii Europejskiej”, Rocznik Administracji Publicznej, 2019, no. 5.
- “Komunikat: Moduł edukacyjno-naukowy Jean Monnet – Cyfrowa transformacja gospodarki w UE i krajach partnerskich / Digital Transformation of the Economy in the EU and Partner Countries”, Rocznik Administracji Publicznej, 2024, no. 10.
- “Aligning EU Expenditure with Biodiversity Objectives: Proofing and Tracking in Focus”, Rocznik Administracji Publicznej, 2025, no. 11.

== Awards and honours ==
In 2008, Kawka received the first prize of the Foundation for the Promotion of European Law for her book Telekomunikacyjne organy regulacyjne w Unii Europejskiej. Problematyka prawna.
