= MCI Capital =

MCI Capital SA
- Type: public company
- Traded as: MCI Warsaw Stock Exchange
- ISIN: PLMCIMG00012
- Industry: private equity fund
- Founded: 1999
- Headquarters: 00-843 Warsaw, Rondo Daszyńskiego 1, Poland
- Key people: Tomasz Czechowicz; supervisory board chairman: Zbigniew Jagiełło
- Number of employees: 22
- Website: www.mci.pl

MCI Capital SA is a private equity fund listed on the Warsaw Stock Exchange (WSE: MCI) established in 1999 by Tomasz Czechowicz with assets under management (AUM) of 2.74 billion PLN (ca. 652 m Euro) as of September 19, 2024. According to Wall Street Journal MCI is one of Poland’s leading private equity companies.

The strategy of MCI is focused on investments in digital economy and climatech, in the expansion and buyout area. MCI operates across Europe, with a particular emphasis on Central Europe. Historically, MCI Group has also managed funds dedicated to investments in private debt, growth equity, and venture capital.

== Business activity ==
The total value of gross assets under the management of MCI – increased by available financing for investment activities (financial commitments) – as at September 19, 2024 was approximately PLN 2.74 billion. Throughout its history, MCI has made a total of 111 investments and over 90 divestments. Since the start of its operations on January 1, 1999, MCI has delivered an 17 percent average annual increase in NAV per share and an internal rate of return of 28,2 percent on its growth and private equity portfolio.

MCI Capital ASI SA is a member of the Polish Association of Capital Investors.

Key people at the company include: Tomasz Czechowicz, founder and managing partner; Zbigniew Jagiełło, head of the supervisory board (previously the longstanding president of PKO Bank Polski); Paweł Borys, managing partner; Ewa Ogryczak, senior partner and chief operating officer.

MCI Capital focuses on investments in companies operating in the following segments:

- SaaS and B2B software
- e-commerce, direct-to-customer and marketplaces (B2C/B2B)
- payments, fintech and insurtech
- digital infrastructure
- energy and retail digital transformation

Investments are typically pursued through recapitalizations from venture capital and private equity funds, carveouts from strategic investors, public-to-private transactions, and founder-owner transitions.

== Selected exits from investments ==
- iZettle (Sweden) – sale of the company to PayPal for over $2 billion – one of the largest fintech exits in Europe.
- RemoteMyApp (Poland) - sale of the global gaming platform to Intel Corporation (Intel's first strategic acquisition in Poland).
- ATMan (Poland) - sale of shares in a data center operator to an investment vehicle managed by Goldmans Sachs Merchant Banking Division.
- Lifebrain (Italy) - sale to Investindustrial, a European private equity fund.
- WP.pl (Poland) - sale of the entire block of shares by Orange to the O2 Group, which sold part of its shares to the MCI fund, debut on the Warsaw Stock Exchange (record capitalization of EUR 800 million).
- Netrisk (Hungary) - implementation of the "buy & build" strategy to build a leading European insurance leader, recapitalization with TA Associates.
- Dotcard (Poland) - sale of one of the Polish leaders in the e-payment market for PLN 315 million to a strategic investor - Nexi Group/Nets, a digital leader on the European market.
- Mall.cz (Czech Republic) - recapitalization of an e-commerce store with a venture capital fund and sale to Allegro.
- Invia (Czech Republic) - recapitalization of the e-travel platform with a venture capital fund, sale to the Rockaway Group for PLN 327 million.
- Azimo (Great Britain) - MCI partially exited the investment, while also becoming a shareholder in a global provider of HR tech solutions – Papaya Global.

== Current portfolio and new investments ==
MCI currently holds shares in 11 portfolio companies and, in line with its investment strategy, the preferred size of investments is EUR 25-100M in a single project. MCI intends to carry out 2-3 investments per year, including the area of green transformation/climatech.

== History ==
- 1999: Establishment of MCI as a digital investor operating in Poland and Central and Eastern Europe
- 1999: First investment in CCS (Computer Communication Systems SA – one of the leading Polish ICT systems integrators)
- 2001: MCI debuts on the WSE, assets under management worth USD 10 million
- 2005: Initial public offering of MCI portfolio company - Travelplanet.pl
- 2008: Entry into private equity investments - division of activity between two subfunds MCI.EuroVentures (PE/buyout) and MCI.TechVentures (venture capital)
- 2010: EUR 100 million of net assets under management
- 2011: Entry into private debt investing
- 2012: Entry into Western European market
- 2016: Value of assets under management EUR 500 million
- 2014: EUR 300 million net assets under management
- 2019: Refocus of strategy on buyout transactions across Europe via its evergreen MCI.EuroVentures fund
- 2021: Record-breaking profit for MCI – PLN 465.79 million of consolidated net profit
- 2022: MCI.EuroVentures acquires 55% of shares in eSky for PLN 158 million. Value of assets under management EUR 652 million
- 2023: MCI among the 100 largest private Polish companies in the Forbes Poland ranking. Purchase of majority shares in Webcon and Focus
- 2024: Purchase of 65% shares in Profitroom, the largest regional supplier of online booking system solutions for hotels. MCI.EuroVentures buys 55% of shares in NTFY, a leader in high-quality boxed diets in Poland
