= Thomas Cook Tourism =

Package holiday provider

- Trade name: Thomas Cook
- Type: Private Limited Company
- Industry: Travel
- Predecessor: Thomas Cook Group plc
- Founded: 5 July 1841; 185 years ago (as Thomas Cook and Son); 2 December 2019; 6 years ago (as Thomas Cook Tourism Company)
- Headquarters: London
- Area served: United Kingdom
- Key people: Ryan Cotton (Director); Marius Turbatu (Director)
- Products: Holidays; Flights; Hotels
- Brands: Thomas Cook
- Services: Travel Agency
- Owner: ESky Group (2024 – present)
- Website: www.thomascook.com

Thomas Cook Tourism (UK) Company Limited, known as Thomas Cook UK, is a British online travel agent which offers package holidays and city breaks around the world. The company was launched in 2019, when the brand was purchased from the insolvent Thomas Cook Group, and began trading in September 2020.

Thomas Cook describes its business model as "package your own holiday", allowing customers to travel whenever and for as long as they wish. Thomas Cook provides access to tens of thousands of hotels and most flight routes leaving the UK.

== History ==
=== 2019 ===
Before the formation of the new company, its owner Fosun International held a 7% stake in the British insolvent Thomas Cook Group.

In August 2019, Fosun negotiated a rescue package for the failing group, which had lost £1.5bn in that year. The package consisted of a £900m bailout, in which Fosun would pay in £450m and the other £450m paid by banks and bondholders; the deal would mean that Fosun would hold a stake of 75 percent in the Thomas Cook Group Tour Operator and 25% in Thomas Cook Group Airlines. The rescue package fell through in September when the creditors, including RBS and Lloyds, demanded an extra £200m to ensure the group survived through winter.

On the morning of 23 September 2019, Thomas Cook Group entered compulsory liquidation and all operations ceased.

On 1 November 2019, it was announced that Fosun had acquired the Thomas Cook brand and numerous hotels for £11m. The new company was set to commence operations in 2020, as Fosun began hiring former Thomas Cook executives to begin relaunch preparations in late 2019.

=== 2020 ===
In September 2020, Fosun said that it was waiting for regulatory approval from ATOL to relaunch Thomas Cook. Fosun's plans did not include Thomas Cook Airlines, or its high street estate. Once Fosun had received ATOL and ABTA certification, the Thomas Cook UK website was launched and the company began offering holidays using the flights that were permitted under COVID-19 pandemic regulations. All holidays were offered as quarantine-free within the UK's travel corridor, and refunds within 14 days were promised if holidays were cancelled by the UK Government.

In October 2020, Thomas Cook began selling holidays to the Canary Islands which had been added to the UK's travel corridor. In December, Thomas Cook introduced quarantine-free long-haul destinations including Dubai and Punta Cana. It also announced that holidays in New York City, Las Vegas and Orlando would be offered from May 2021 provided COVID-19 regulations were relaxed to allow British citizens to travel to the United States.

=== 2021 ===
In the beginning of January the Prime Minister Boris Johnson placed England into national lockdown due to the COVID-19 pandemic. This meant that Thomas Cook and other UK tour operators were forced to cancel all holidays departing England until mid-February. Holidays with flights departing from Scotland and Wales would be cancelled until the end of January. By March 2021, bookings had been resumed again.

=== 2024 ===
In September 2024, Fosun agreed to sell the business to a Polish company, ESky Group. A month later, it was announced that the transaction had been completed.
