= National Development Bank (Poland) =

Bank in Poland

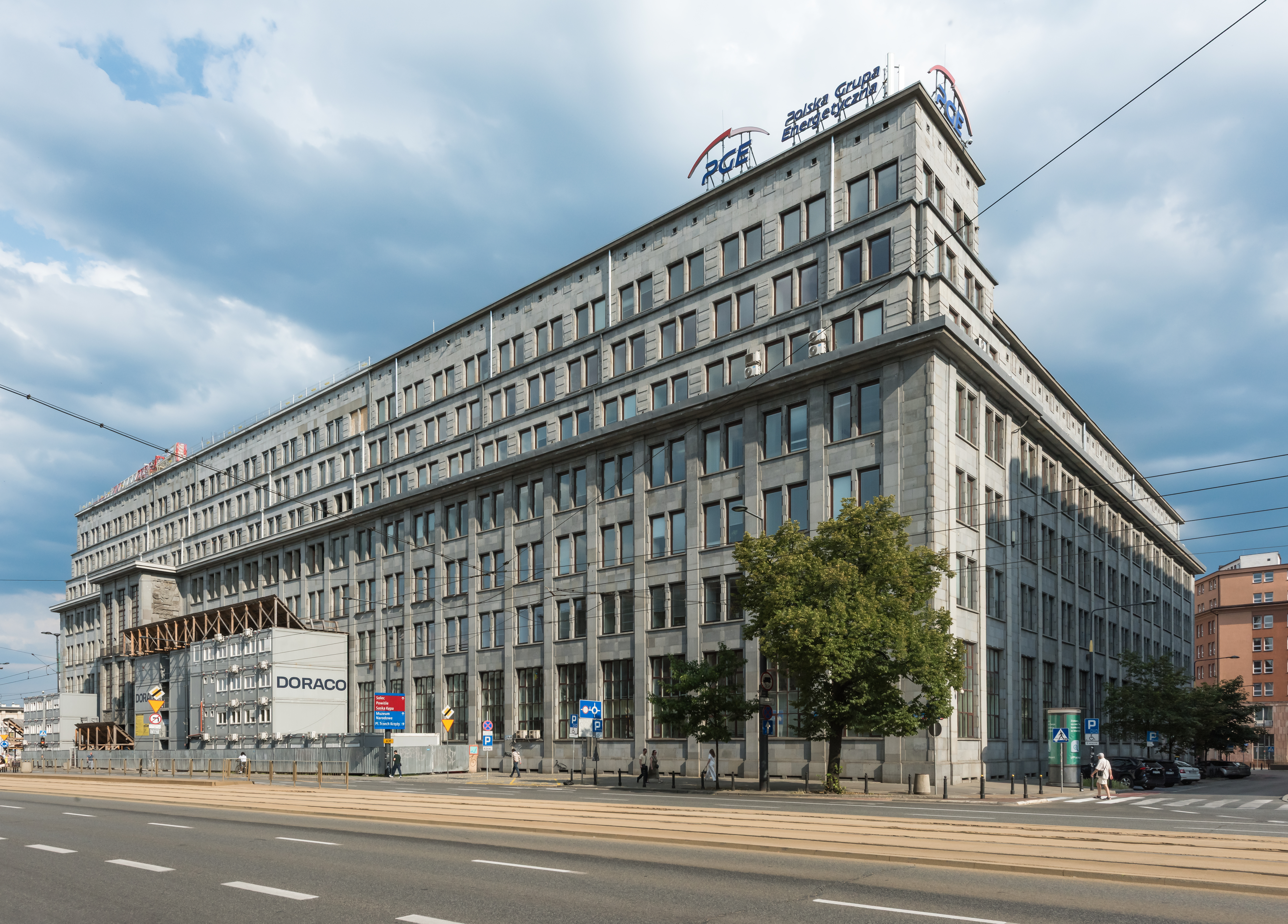
- Company type: Public bank
- Industry: Financial services
- Founded: 1924; 102 years ago
- Headquarters: Aleje Jerozolimskie 7 Warsaw, Poland
- Key people: Beata Daszyńska-Muzyczka (CEO); Paweł Borys (chairman)
- Products: Export, investment, housing support
- Operating income: PLN 369.9 million (2020)
- Net income: PLN 315.7 million (2020)
- Total assets: PLN 160,301.2 million (end 2020)
- Total equity: PLN 23,874.0 million (end 2020)
- Number of employees: 1 859 (FTE, end 2020)
- Capital ratio: 33.06% (end 2020)
- Website: en.bgk.pl

The National Development Bank (Polish: Bank Gospodarstwa Krajowego, BGK) is a Polish national development bank with headquarters in Warsaw, is a state-owned bank in Poland, operating under a dedicated bill of law. Its main tasks are: support and servicing of export transactions, issuing governmental guarantees, and support of housing.

Founded in 1924 under an initiative of Minister of Treasury Władysław Grabski, its first president was a former Minister of Treasury, Jan Kanty Steczkowski. The bank was involved in Polish international trade, funding of numerous companies and of Polish Central Industrial Region.

After the World War II its activity was gradually phased-out, until it was reactivated in 1989.

== Headquarters ==
The bank's monumental modernistic headquarters was designed by Rudolf Świerczyński. Constructed in 1928–1931, it was recognized as a monument in 1965.

== History ==
=== Second Polish Republic ===
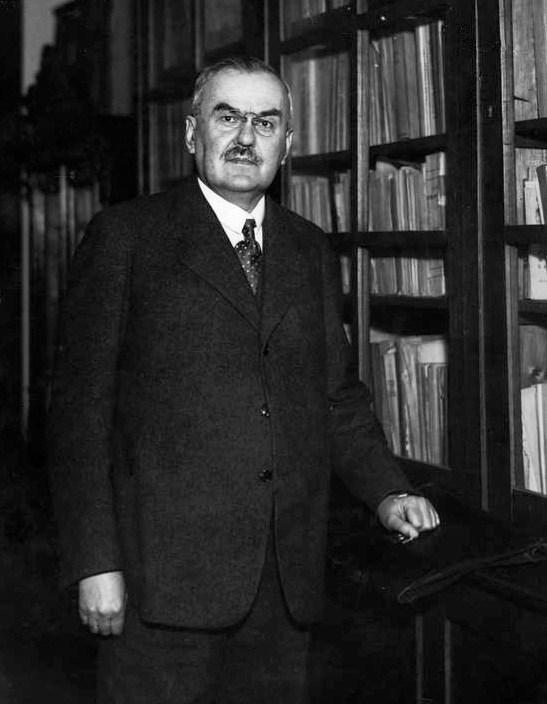
Władysław Grabski

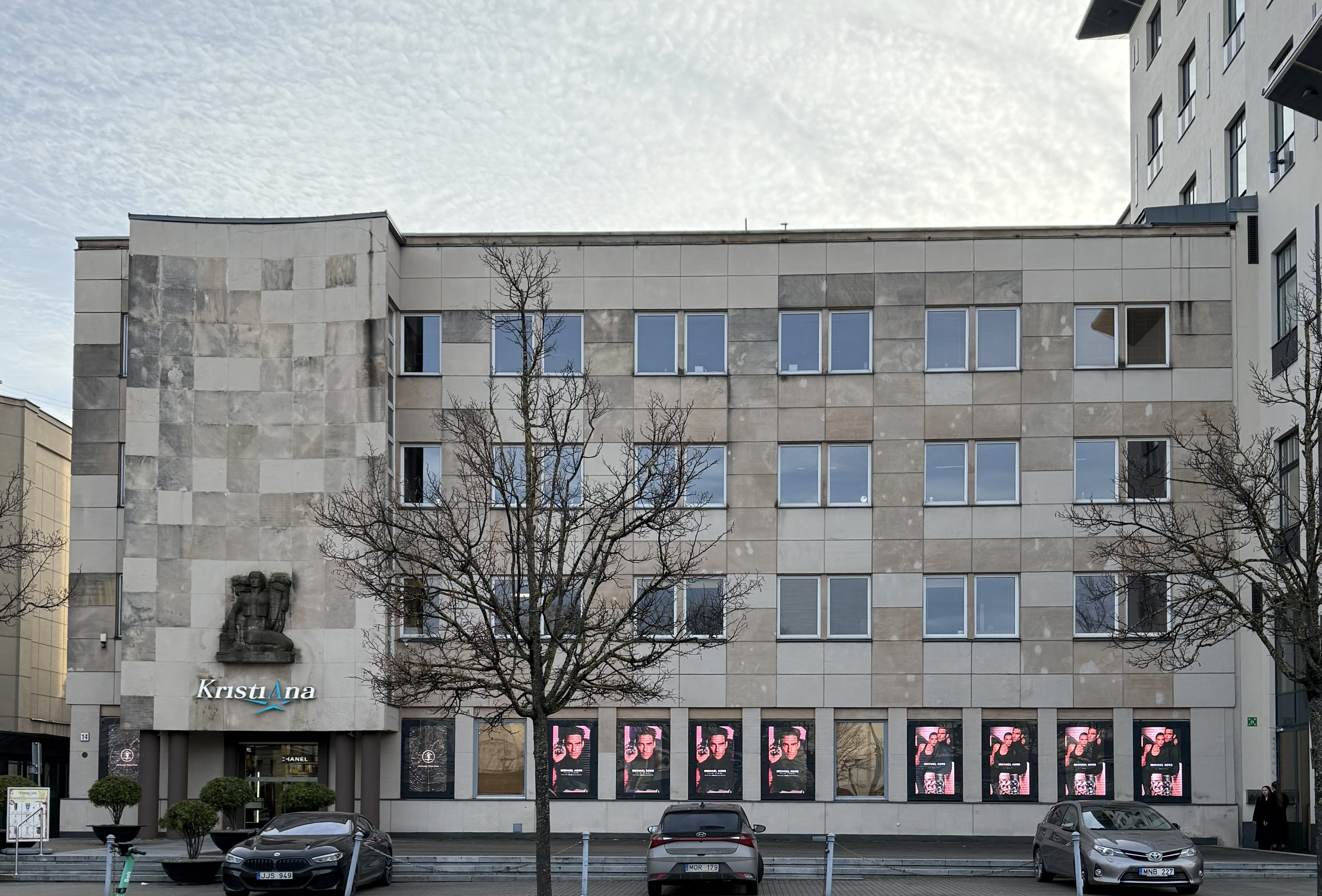
Former branch building in Vilnius, erected in 1937-1938.

The history of BGK dates back to 1924 when the President of the Republic of Poland, at the initiative of then Prime Minister and Treasury Minister Wladyslaw Grabski, issued a decree establishing BGK. It was created by a merger of three public banks from the Galicia region, the Bank Krajowy, the State Reconstruction Bank and the Credit Institution of Malopolska Cities.

The creation of BGK was a result of Grabski's economic concepts. Despite being opposed to statism in industry and trade, Grabski was at the same time a supporter of strong state banking. The Bank's main tasks included granting long-term loans through issuance of covered, municipal, railway and bank bonds and offering local government loans as well as providing loans to savings institutions and performing all other banking tasks. The Bank had special obligations towards state-owned and local government companies. Securities issued by BGK were guaranteed by the State Treasury.

Bank Gospodarstwa Krajowego, in accordance with its statutory tasks, from the beginning of its existence financially supported the development of Polish economy. BGK was financially involved in all major investments of the Second Polish Republic. Among them is e.g. the seaport and shipyard in Gdynia. One of the forms of BGK's activity in this field were activities undertaken by BGK at the request of the government, aimed at financial protection and modernization of strategic enterprises of the economic and military interests of the state. This became the basis for the creation of the so-called BGK conglomerate, which included enterprises of great importance for the national economy and defense of the country: the Association of Starachowice Mining and Smelting Plants, Grodzisk Chemical Plant, Boruta Chemical Industry, The Association of Potassium Salt Mining and a number of other plants.

Starting from 1936, BGK was included in realization of state investment plan of creating the Central Industrial Region.

The Bank also administered the government's special purpose funds, including the Credit Institution Support Fund, State Construction Fund, State Credit Fund and Labour Fund.

At the turn of the 1920s and 1930s, BGK became one of the biggest banks of inter-war Poland and served as the primary participant in the economic restructuring process.

Between 1928 and 1931, a BGK building designed by Rudolf Swierczynski was constructed in Warsaw's Aleje Jerozolimskie street.

=== Post-war development ===
After World War II, BGK was reactivated with economist Professor Edward Lipski at its helm. In 1948, as a result of a banking reform, BGK was supposed to be an investment bank. Its role during 1948-1989 period was mainly limited to pre-war foreign debt service.

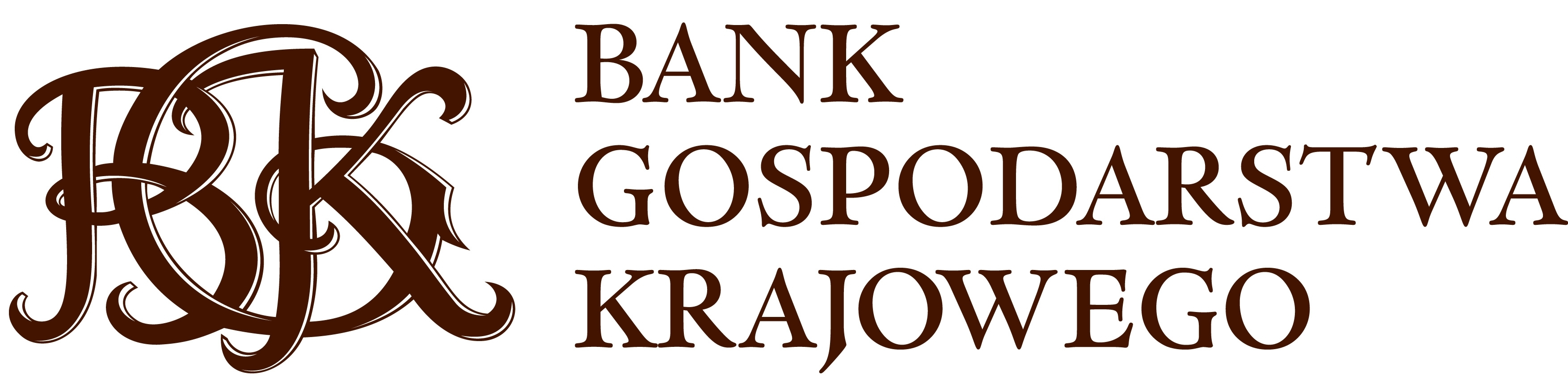
Former BGK logo

In 1989, BGK resumed it operation as a state-owned bank and as such acted primarily as issue agent for Treasury bonds, offered for the first time in several decades. The Bank's activities focused on the preparation of sub-agent deals for the sale and redemption of bonds, development of accounting and reporting rules and organizing a nationwide sales network.

In December 1997, BGK returned to its pre-war headquarters in Aleje Jerozolimskie in Warsaw.

In modern Poland, the government tasks the Bank with the operation of a number of special purpose funds and programmes (including the National Road Fund, National Housing Fund, Thermomodernisation and Renovation Fund and the Railway Fund).

BGK participates in the implementation of the state's economic objectives. During the economic slowdown, it provides funding for infrastructure investments and thus supports growth of this sector of the economy. It is an important link in the provision of funding and support for areas that are important for the society, such as housing infrastructure, energy efficiency and public utilities. It supports Polish exporters by taking on part of the risk related to trading activities of Polish companies. In collaboration with other financial institutions, BGK improves access to funding for businesses, which translates into lower unemployment and stronger GDP growth.

BGK manages several special purpose funds and a number of governmental programmes. Its mission is to support social and economic growth of Poland and the public finance sector in the performance of its tasks.

== Three Seas Initiative Investment Fund ==
The twelve members of the Three Seas Initiative met for their first summit in 2016, in Dubrovnik. It is composed of Austria, Bulgaria, Croatia, Czech Republic, Estonia, Hungary, Latvia, Lithuania, Poland, Romania, Slovakia, and Slovenia.

In 2019, Bank Gospodarstwa Krajowego and Export–Import Bank of Romania established the Three Seas Initiative Investment Fund. It is focusing on projects creating transport, energy and digital infrastructure in the Three Seas region. The aim is to raise up to EUR 3-5 billion.

The Fund will engage, on a commercial basis, in infrastructure projects with a total value of up to EUR 100 billion, while the needs of the Three Seas region have been estimated at over EUR 570 billion.

== Presidents ==
- Jan Kanty Steczkowski – 1924-1927
- Roman Górecki – 1927–1935, 1936-1941
- Karol Alexandrowicz – 1943-1946
- Edward Lipiński – 1946-1948
- Jan Wojnar – 1948-1949
- Czesław Gawłowski – 1989-1991
- Mariusz Stolarz – 1991-1993
- Danuta Chmielewska – 1993-1996
- Waldemar Nowak – 1996-1997
- Danuta Chmielewska – 1997-1998
- Ryszard Pazura – 1998-2002
- Witold Koziński – 2002-2004
- Andrzej Dorosz – 2004-2006
- Wojciech Kuryłek – 2006-2007
- Ireneusz Fąfara – 2007-2009
- Tomasz Mironczuk – 2009-2011
- Dariusz Daniluk – 2011-2013
- Dariusz Kacprzyk – 2013-2016
- Mirosław Panek – 2016, Acting President
- Beata Daszyńska-Muzyczka – 2016-2024
- Paweł Nierada – 2024, Acting President
- Mirosław Czekaj – since 12th of April 2024

== See also ==
- Korporacja Ubezpieczeń Kredytów Eksportowych
- Polish Investment and Trade Agency (Polska Agencja Inwestycji i Handlu)
- Polish Development Fund
- List of national development banks
