= Polish National Agency for Academic Exchange =

State agency for academic mobility and international research collaboration

The Polish National Agency for Academic Exchange
- Narodowa Agencja Wymiany Akademickiej

Agency overview
- Formed: October 1, 2017; 8 years ago
- Jurisdiction: Government of Poland
- Headquarters: ul. Polna 40, Warsaw, Poland
- Minister responsible: Marcin Kulasek
- Agency executives: dr Wojciech Karczewski, Director; Lukasz Golota, Vice-director
- Website: nawa.gov.pl

The Polish National Agency for Academic Exchange (NAWA, Polish: Narodowa Agencja Wymiany Akademickiej) is a governmental agency in Poland established to carry out tasks related to the academic mobility between Poland and other countries. Since November 2018 the agency is part of Academic Cooperation Association. It primarily provides grants to individuals and organizations rather than through its own staff.

== History ==
NAWA was founded partially out of concerns about brain drain from Poland. The legislation to create NAWA was prepared by the Ministry of Science and Higher Education. NAWA was created by an legislation from 7 July 2017 and began operating on 1 October 2017. Changes to the authorizing legislation were made in 2018 and 2019.

Grażyna Żebrowska, a physicist, was appointed director of NAWA on May 8, 2020.

On October 1, 2024, Prime Minister Donald Tusk appointed Dr. Wojciech Karczewski as the director of the Polish National Agency for Academic Exchange

== Activities ==
NAWA improves Polish education by facilitating the integration of Polish universities with academics worldwide by arranging conferences, facilitating cooperation on international research projects, and assisting foreign students. NAWA provides scholarships to people of Polish ancestry to study in Poland. NAWA funds research performed by Polish Universities in partnership with foreign collaborators. NAWA encourages Polish scientists living abroad to return to the country. NAWA supports foreign scientists to do post-doctoral work in Poland. Alternately, NAWA provides funding for Polish scientists to do internships abroad. NAWA funds student support services for foreign students in Poland.

NAWA provides both Polish and foreign students, researchers and higher education institutions with scholarships and grants in four different fields, with the main focus on mobility:

- programs for students
- programs for scientists
- programs for institutions
- Polish language programs

Additionally, the agency disseminates information about the Polish system of tertiary education and science.

NAWA also serves to improve the international public relations of Poland.

== Promotional campaigns ==
NAWA runs two campaigns promoting Poland abroad at the moment.

The Ready, Study, Go! Poland (RSGP) campaign is aiming at delivering the information about Poland as a prospective study and research destination to all candidates in the world.

Research in Poland campaign promotes Poland as a perfect destination for researchers and university graduates willing to start or continue their research career abroad.

== Structure ==
NAWA is overseen by the Minister of Science and Higher Education. The director is appointed by the Prime Minister. NAWA's Council is an advisory body which makes proposals for the organization's direction and development.

== See also ==
- The National Centre for Research and Development in Poland
- The National Science Centre (Poland)
