= Tomasz Czechowicz =

Polish entrepreneur and private equity investor

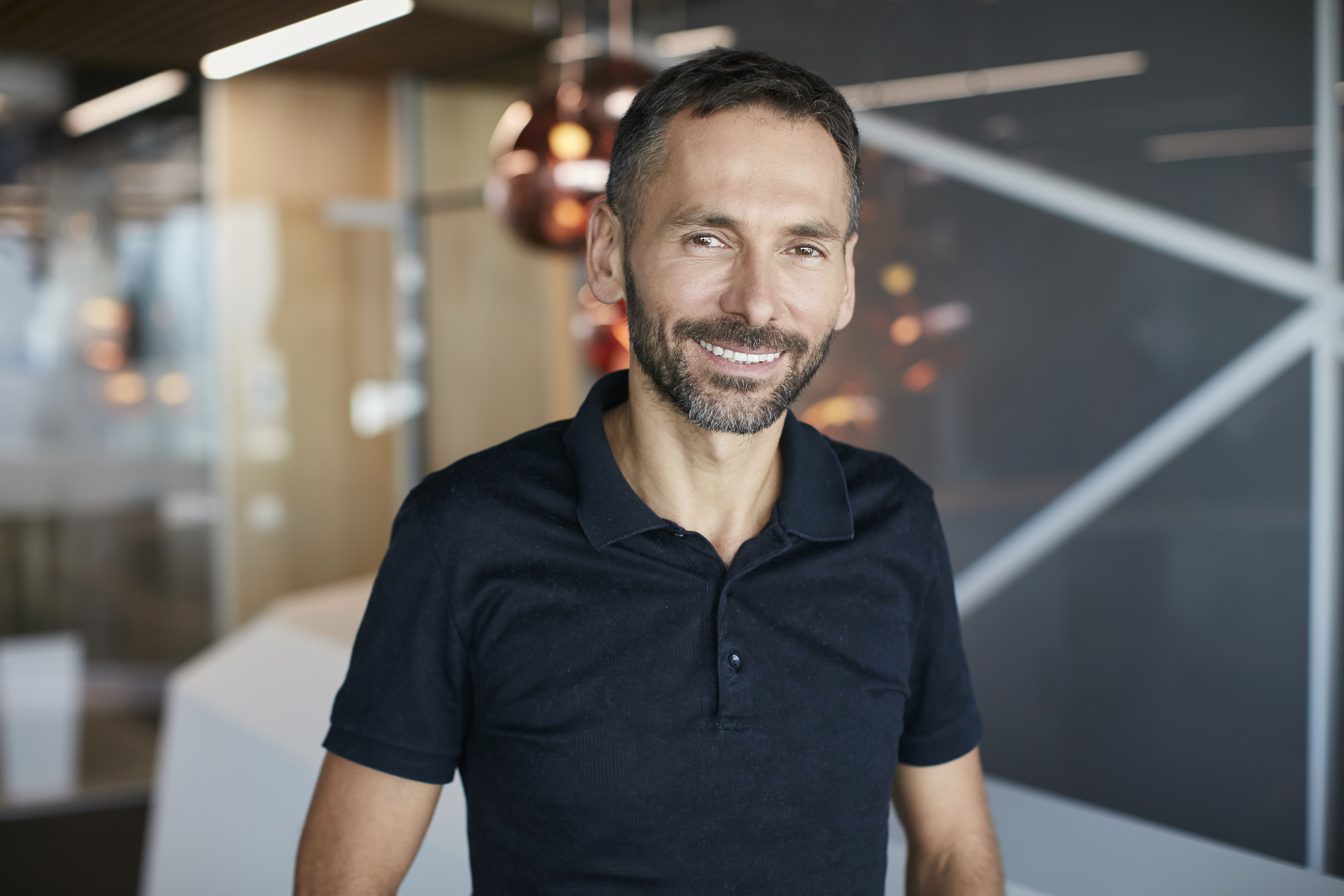
- Tomasz Czechowicz
- Born: 23 June 1970 (age 56); Legnica, Poland
- Education: Wroclaw University of Technology; Warsaw School of Economics
- Occupation: Businessman

Tomasz Czechowicz (born 23 June 1970) is a Polish entrepreneur and a private equity investor. He is the founder and Chief Investment Officer of MCI Capital SA, a private equity group in Central and Eastern Europe. He also serves on the supervisory boards of multiple companies. Czechowicz manages a group of investment funds active in Poland and across Central and Eastern Europe. The funds are primarily focused on supporting companies in the technology and internet services sectors.

== Education ==
Czechowicz is a graduate of Wrocław University of Technology, Wrocław University of Economics, Master of Business Administration received from the University of Minnesota and the Warsaw School of Economics.

== Business ventures ==
Czechowicz began pursuing various business ventures from a young age. As a teenager, he coded, produced and sold computer accessories at the trade center in Wrocław, and later in Warsaw as well. When he moved to Wrocław to attend the university, he also began importing old and new computers to Poland, among them Commodore 64s, which made him one of the company's largest European customers.

In 1990 Tomasz Czechowicz, Janusz Krasnopolski and Tomasz Gomułkiewicz co-founded JTT Computer SA. The company continued importing Commodores. In 1997, the company reached a milestone agreement with Intel and Microsoft that allowed them to begin assembling their own PCs under the ADAX brand. Czechowicz was the company's CEO until 1998. During these eight years, he turned the company into the leading Central European PC assembly and distribution business, generating over $100 mln in revenue. In a 2006 interview Tomasz Czechowicz said his experience at this company played a significant role in shaping him and his future business ventures. In an interview from 2016, he commented that JTT Computer S.A. was one of his biggest business challenges, but also one which prepared him well for his next business endeavors.

In 1999, after leaving JTT Computer S.A., Czechowicz founded MCI Group, one of the leading private equity firms in Poland and in Europe, and has been its managing partner since.

MCI Capital ASI SA is a private equity fund with activities under management of PLN 2,7 billion (as of 19 September 2024). MCI focuses on buyout and expansion capital investments in businesses operating in or supporting the digital economy, with a preferred investment size of €30-100 million in a single project. MCI currently holds shares in 11 portfolio companies and, in line with its investment strategy, plans to pursue 2 to 3 new investments annually.

Some of MCI’s most significant investments completed to date include, amongst others: iZettle (which was sold to PayPal for over $2 billion), RemoteMyApp (sold to Intel Corporation), ATMan (sold to a Goldman Sachs-managed investment fund), WP.pl (sale of the entire block of shares by Orange to the O2 Group, which sold part of its shares to the MCI fund, debut on the Warsaw Stock Exchange – record capitalization of EUR 800 million), Invia (sold to Rockaway Group for over PLN 300 million), Netrisk (implementation of the "buy & build" strategy to build a leading European insurance leader, recapitalization with TA Associates), Dotcard (sale of one of the Polish leaders in the e-payment market for PLN 315 million to a strategic investor Nexi Group/Nets, a digital leader on the European market), sale of e-shop Mall.cz to Naspers, sale of Mall.cz to Naspers, and exit from Lifebrain to Investindustrial.

== Awards ==
- One of the TOP-10 most influential people in European Internet – awarded by Business Week in 2000
- Global Leader for Tomorrow – awarded by World Economic Forum in Davos in 2001 “for his exceptional feeling of the market, professionalism, vision and business efficiency
- The TOP Manager of Year 2007 – awarded by TOP MANAGEMENT and angel.me within the framework of “The Entrepreneur Awards of the Year” program for successful implementation of MCI Group’s strategy
- Wektor 2013 – awarded by Employers of Poland to exceptional people from the world of culture, science, business and media in Poland
- The Top Manager of Year 2015 – awarded by Polish Edition of Businessweek Bloomberg for successful management, successes, persistence, innovations and contesting other companies not only on the domestic market, but also the foreign one
- List of 100 richest Polish people by Forbes – Tomasz Czechowicz appeared on the list several times, for example: in 2011 (82nd), 2014, 2015 and 2016 (64th)
- List of 100 richest Polish people by Wprost – Tomasz Czechowicz appeared on the list several times, for example: in 2014 (78th), 2015 (46th), 2016 (66th) and 2017 (89th)
- CEE Mergers & Acquisitions Award in "Professional" category – awarded on 23 March 2017 by CEE M&A jury for dedication, outstanding results and top quality client services in CEE, SEE and NEE
- Nominee and finalist, both by himself and together with MCI, in a number of categories in PE Diamonds – awarded by Polish Private Equity and Venture Capital Association, member of Invest Europe
- Capitalist of the Year (2020) by Forbes Polska

== Personal interests ==
Tomasz Czechowicz devotes his free time to a number of sports. He was quoted in Onet Biznes, saying that “Doing sports allows me to decrease the amount of days I need for the holiday. Thanks to this hobby, I keep myself in good condition, which is necessary in this profession."

- Czechowicz is an avid triathlete. He has completed multiple full IronMan competitions, including, amongst others: Gdynia 2021, Barcelona 2019, Emilia-Romagna 2020, Panama City Beach (Florida) 2020.
- He has also competed in marathons around the world (over 50 times), including in New York (5 times), Warsaw (5 times), Miami (2 times), as well as in Berlin, London, Chicago, Paris, Tokyo, Beirut and Istanbul. He also took part in the ultramarathon "Rzeznik" in Bieszczady (80 km).
- He also enjoys mountain climbing, trekking, and ski touring (including mountain routes such as Epinephrine/Red Rocks, Gabarou-Alboni, numerous routes in Yosemite/California, ice climbing on Mt. Blanc de Tacul, north face of Marmolada in the Dolomites, Matterhorn/Swiss route, ski run from Mont Blanc, climbing on Kilimanjaro, Chachani/Peru. In an interview for „Polityka” Czechowicz remarks that „mountains allow you to relax and they teach how to assess the risk, since you can pay a lot for every wrong move or bad decision”.
