= Dynamic packaging =

Flexible method of booking holidays

Dynamic packaging is a method used in package holiday bookings to enable consumers to build their own package of flights, accommodation, and car rental instead of purchasing a pre-defined package. Dynamic packages differ from traditional package tours in that the pricing is always based on current availability, escorted group tours are rarely included, and trip-specific add-ons such as airport parking and show tickets are often available. Dynamic packages are similar in that often the air, hotel, and car rates are available only as part of a package or only from a specific seller. The term "dynamic packaging" is often used incorrectly to describe the less sophisticated process of interchanging various travel components within a package, however, this practice is more accurately described as "dynamic bundling". True dynamic packaging demands the automated recombination of travel components based on the inclusion of rules that not only dictate the content of the package but also conditional pricing rules based on various conditions such as the trip characteristics, suppliers contributing components, the channel of distribution, and terms of sale. Dynamic packages are primarily sold online, but online travel agencies will also sell by phone owing to the strong margins and high sale price of the product.

Dynamic packaging is dynamic at several levels. Firstly, inventory is sourced dynamically, meaning the dynamic packaging solution will source flights, accommodation and car rental components for the package in real-time. Secondly, these components are dynamically combined into packages. Thirdly, the package is dynamically priced and is usually given an opaque total price.

== Benefits ==
Dynamic packages are normally given a single, opaque price, meaning the wholesaler's cost of the individual components is hidden from the consumer. The wholesaler often obtains special package-only cost rates for travel components, such as negotiated fares for flights or special package rates for accommodation or car rental. These cost prices are typically significantly lower than the cost prices suppliers offer for the same products if they were to be sold as single components. Hence, the wholesaler will be able to offer the consumer a combined saving for the dynamic package, without reducing his own margins.

Opaque pricing of dynamic packages hide the price of the included components. This has several benefits. Suppliers of travel products often impose a minimum selling price for their products. For instance, a hotel might give the wholesaler a room at cost price X, but on the condition that the room is not sold for less than Y (hotels do this to prevent wholesalers from competing with themselves). With dynamic packaging, the customer is not presented with the room price, only the overall package price, so hotels typically allow the wholesaler to discount the (hidden) price of the hotel more.

Opaque pricing also has benefits for airlines. Airlines tend to increase their fares the closer you get to the departure date, even if there are many available seats. This is to "train" the consumers to book early, making it easier for the airline to do proper revenue management. If airlines were to dump their fares if a flight failed to fill up, then this would train the customers to wait until very close to departure before booking. This would make it virtually impossible for an airline to manage their fares (fares could then only be determined based on historical data and not based on current demand). Dynamic packaging allows an airline to get rid of distressed inventory at discounted fares, as the discounted fare is effectively hidden from the consumer.

== Preconditions ==
Dynamic Packaging is also often misunderstood since it requires that the provider of Dynamic Packaging be a wholesaler, who must also issue tickets, vouchers or other redeemable coupons in order to become a Dynamic Packager. Without an inventory management system, and a ticket, coupon or voucher issuing system to make the prices of the individual components appear as one price to the consumer and allow each travel service provider to know what rate to accept or charge the traveler; dynamic packaging does not work. Many travel retailers have mistakenly assumed they could provide dynamic packaging without an inventory management system, mark-up engine with business rules and a ticket issuing and resolution system.

The wholesaler must either directly control the inventory that is combined into packages or buy the package components up-front from other travel suppliers. This implies that dynamic packages (as with static packages) are always pre-paid by the customer.

The wholesaler would typically also require special discounted fares/rates from the travel suppliers. For car rental, the supplier (car rental company or intermediary) should ideally supply their price based on calendar days rather than hour-by-hour. Calendar day rates reduce the number of vehicle availability/pricing scans the wholesaler must make. For packages that include flights, the outbound arrival and return departure date/times determine the car rental pick-up and drop-off date/times. If car rental rates were by the hour they would differ for each flight option, hence the wholesaler would have to issue a vehicle availability search for each available flight, while with 24-hour rates one single vehicle availability search is enough to cater for all flight options.

== See also ==
- Travel technology
