= Polish Development Fund =

Polish state-owned development fund

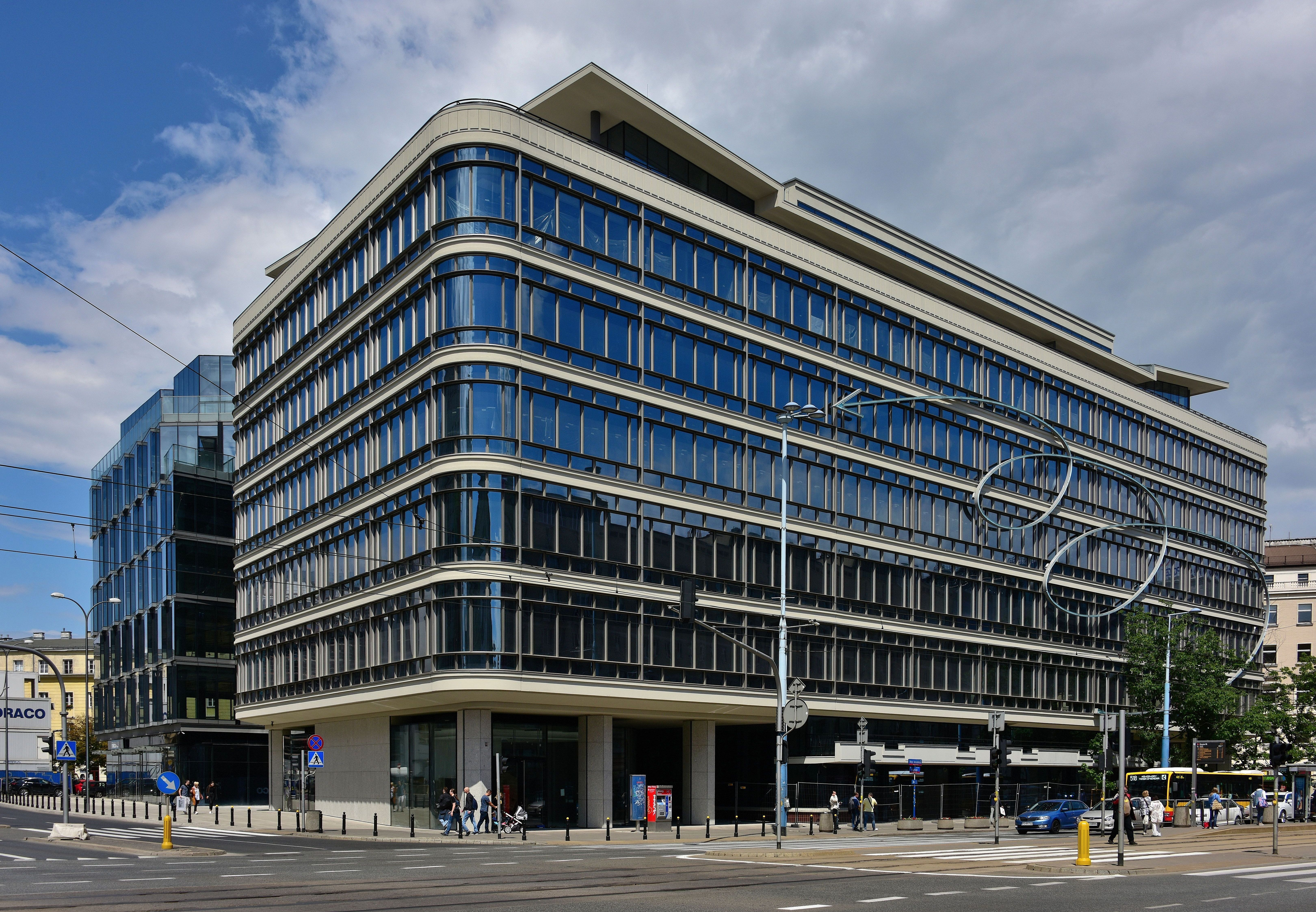
- The Fund's headquarters in Warsaw
- Company type: Joint stock company
- Industry: Investments
- Founded: April 1, 2016; 9 years ago
- Founder: Ministry of State Treasury (Poland)
- Headquarters: ul. Krucza 50, Warsaw, Poland
- Area served: Poland
- Key people: Piotr Matczuk
- Products: Capital investments; Loans and guarantees; Export insurance; Consultancy and promotion
- Website: pfr.pl

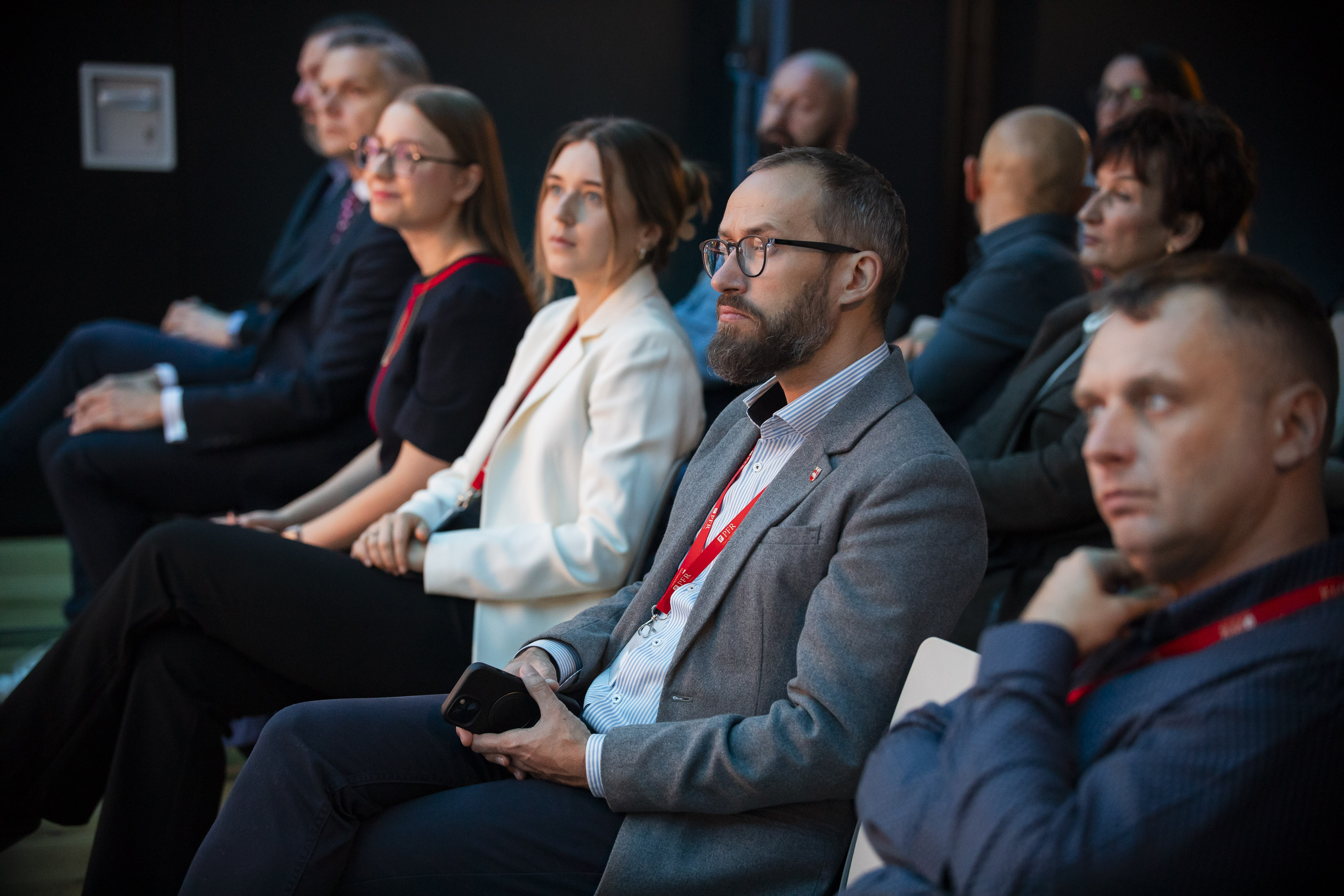
Employees of the Polish Development Fund during the PFR Academy for Cities program conference. October 2024

The Polish Development Fund (PFR) (Polish: Polski Fundusz Rozwoju, PFR) is a Polish joint-stock company owned by the State Treasury. Its main objective is to support investments that foster Poland's economic development.

== Summary ==
PFR provides capital, financial tools and solutions to support enterprises and local governments in their development. It also offers advisory services and educational programmes to help build competencies, increase innovation and boost the competitiveness of market participants. The fund promotes sustainable development, digitalisation and the country's long-term economic growth. The PFR was established in 2016 on the basis of the Polskie Inwestycje Rozwojowe, which had existed since June 2013. Since July 2024 Piotr Matczuk is the President of the third term. PFR's headquarters is located in Cedet at 50 Krucza st. in Warsaw.

== Activity of the Polish Development Fund ==
The Polish Development Fund implements programmes that contribute to increasing Poland's long-term investment and economic potential, developing innovation, equal opportunities and sustainable development.

According to the Strategic Directions for the Polish Development Fund Capital Group announced in February 2025, PFR's priority tasks in 2025 will include investments related to energy transition, innovation, international competitiveness of Polish entrepreneurs, capital market development, long-term economic resilience and defence.

The main tasks of the Polish Development Fund include capital, infrastructure and municipal investment activities.

In 2018, PFR and PESA Bydgoszcz S.A. signed an investment agreement under which PFR participated in the financing of this largest Polish manufacturer in the railway industry. By 2023, PFR have invested PLN 500 million in the Bydgoszcz plant, resulting in a number of organisational changes and a focus on the development of new technologies.

The Polish Development Fund own 30% of the Baltic Hub - container port in Gdansk. PFR has invested PLN 500 million in the construction of an installation terminal for handling offshore wind farms at the BalticHub port in Gdansk. Part of the funding for the investment will come from the National Reconstruction Plan (NRP). The investment in the new terminal at the Port of Gdansk is expected to add 21 hectares to Poland's land area.

In February 2025, a memorandum of cooperation was signed between the Polish Development Fund, Google and OChK at the Google for Startups Campus at the Praski Koneser Centre in Warsaw. The signing of the memorandum was accompanied by a press conference by Prime Minister Donald Tusk and Alphabet CEO Sundar Pichai.

The Polish Development Fund also invests through its subsidiaries. PFR Ventures is a fund management company that invests in venture capital and private equity funds together with private investors, business angels and corporations.

In 2023, 137 out of 438 transactions on the Polish startup market are investments with the participation of the PFR Ventures fund, which represents approximately 25% of investments in innovative companies.

Another subsidiary, PFR TFI, manages two foreign expansion funds that co-finance foreign investments by Polish companies: Fundusz Ekspansji Zagranicznej (the Polish International Development Fund) FIZ AN and Fundusz Ekspansji Zagranicznej 2 (the Polish International Development Fund 2) FIZ AN 2.

In 2024, the Polish Development Fund made its first investment in Ukraine, financing the expansion of the Euvic Group IT consortium. Half of the capital for the investment will be provided by the Polish Development Fund through the FEZ2 fund managed by PFR TFI, which will lend $2.5 million to Euvic.

The Polish Development Fund manages the record keeping and administration system of the Employee Capital Plans (pl. Pracownicze Plany Kapitałowe, PPK) - a voluntary, universal pension savings scheme. Through its subsidiary, PFR Portal PPK, it operates a dedicated internet portal with information on PPK.

The Polish Development Fund's activities also include the development of innovation and support for increasing the level of digitalisation in companies and local authorities, as well as support for the creation and development of start-ups.

== Strategy for 2026-2030 ==
According to the Strategy of the Polish Development Fund Capital Group for 2026-2030, announced on December 10, 2025, the priority areas of PFR include:

1. Economic Resilience and Defence
2. Innovation and Technological Autonomy of Poland
3. International Competitiveness of Polish Enterprises
4. Long-Term Financial Security for Polish citizens
5. Energy Transformation

== Structure ==
The Polish Development Fund is part of the Polish Development Fund Capital Group, whose main objective is to support the development of the Polish economy by investing in and financing innovative projects and supporting entrepreneurs in various industries. Its activities are focused on stimulating economic growth and contributing to the creation of new jobs in Poland.

The Polish Development Fund Capital Group includes:

- Polski Fundusz Rozwoju – Polish Development Hub
- PFR TFI - fund management and support for long-term savings
- PFR Ventures - investments in the domestic venture capital and private equity market
- PFR Nieruchomości - investments in residential projects
- PFR Portal PPK - knowledge and skills centre for employee capital plans
- PFR Operacje - shared services centre for the PFR Capital Group.

== Company authorities ==
Management Board

Piotr Matczuk - President of the Management Board

Mariusz Jaszczyk - Vice-President of the Management Board responsible for Finance and Development

Mikołaj Raczyński - Vice-President of the Management Board responsible for Investments

Supervisory Board

Magdalena Piłat - Chairwoman of the Supervisory Board

Grzegorz Pazura - Vice-Chairman of the Supervisory Board

Andrzej Halesiak - Member of the Supervisory Board

Ryszard Kokoszyński - Member of the Supervisory Board

Sylwia Jarosz-Żukowska - Member of the Supervisory Board

Adam Mariański - Member of the Supervisory Board

Paweł Borys was the Chairman of the Management Board in the first and second term (2016 - 2024).

== System of development institutions ==
The Polish Development Fund Group operates within the new architecture of Polish development institutions. Its coherent strategy and instrument platform integrate the Industrial Development Agency (Agencja Rozwoju Przemysłu, ARP), Bank Gospodarstwa Krajowego (BGK), Export Credit Insurance Corporation (Korporacja Ubezpieczeń Kredytów Eksportowych, KUKE), Polish Investment and Trade Agency (Polska Agencja Inwestycji i Handlu), and the Polish Agency for Enterprise Development (Polska Agencja Rozwoju Przedsiębiorczości, PARP).

Since July 2025, Development Institutions have been creating the Team Poland initiative, supporting companies in their foreign expansion. As part of the Development Institutions System, the Polish Development Fund is one of the investors in the Innovate Poland program, announced on November 14, 2025, by the Minister of Finance and Economy, Andrzej Domański. Its aim is to mobilize private and institutional capital and create a sustainable mechanism for financing innovation. It is inspired by the French Tibi Plan.

The PFR Group is a new entity which continues, in a new format, the tradition of Bank Gospodarstwa Krajowego, established in 1924 as a part of the reform program of Prime Minister Władysław Grabski. Most countries of the world have similar development institutions. The biggest development institutions in Europe which have similar operating standards to those of the PFR Group include the German KfW (Kreditanstalt für Wiederaufbau) group, the French CDC (Caisse des Dépôts et Consignation) group, the Italian CDP (Cassa Depositi e Prestiti) group, and the Hungarian MFB (Magyar Fejlesztési Bank) group.

== See also ==
- National Centre for Research and Development
