= National Science Centre =

Polish government agency

- Narodowe Centrum Nauki

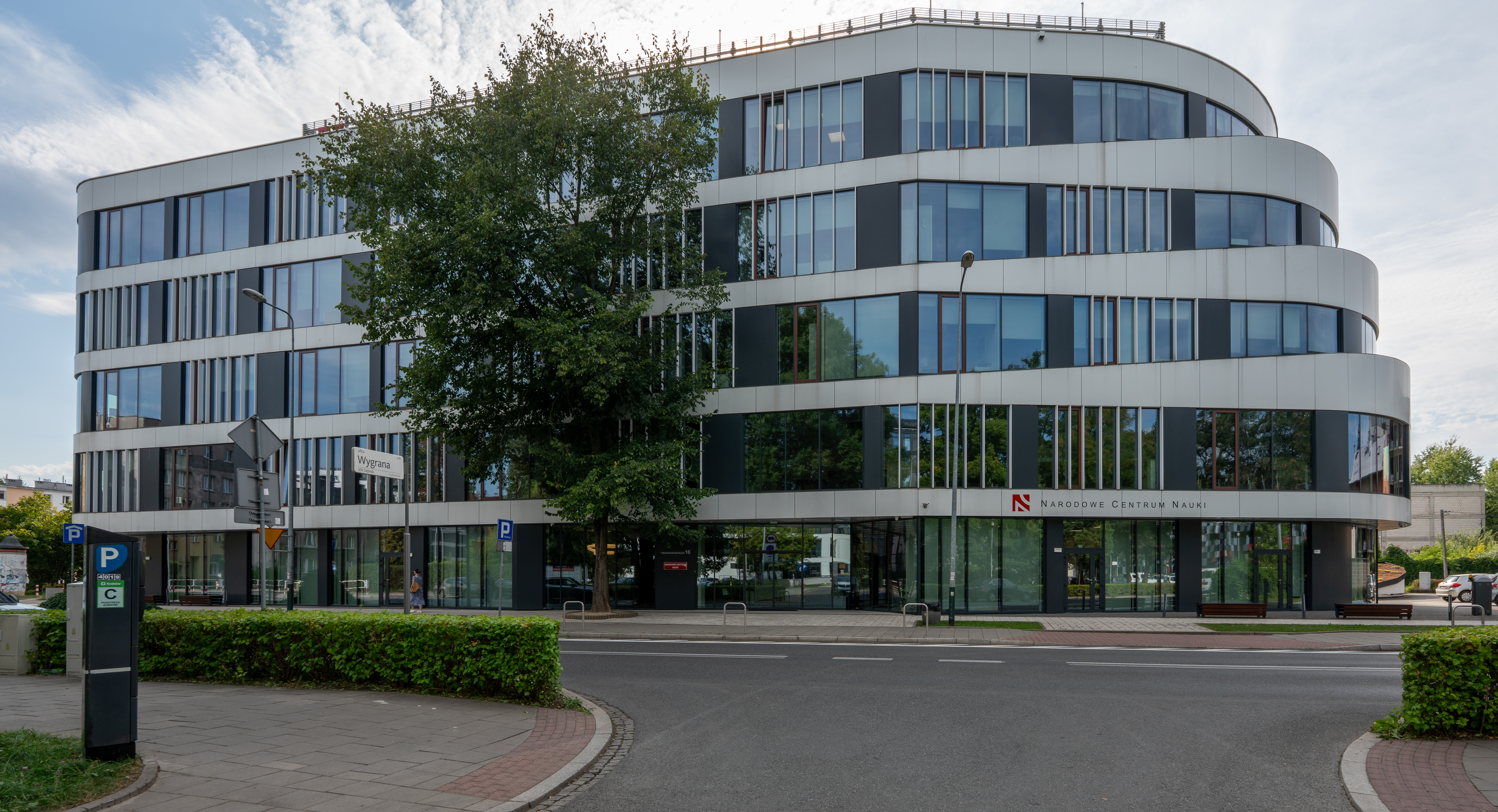
- Headquarters in Kraków

Grant agency overview
- Formed: 1 October 2010
- Jurisdiction: Poland
- Headquarters: ul. Twardowskiego 16, Kraków
- Grant agency executive: Krzysztof Jóźwiak, Director
- Website: ncn.gov.pl

The National Science Centre (Polish: Narodowe Centrum Nauki, often abbreviated NCN) is a governmental grant-making agency responsible for providing financial support for the conduct of basic science research in Poland and various programs to assist scientists throughout their careers.

The NCN was founded in 2010, three years after the foundation of National Centre for Research and Development. Similar to National Science Foundation in the United States, NCN is the largest grant-making agency in Poland for fundamental research and basic science and collaborates with corresponding agencies worldwide.

== Works ==
The central tasks of NCN include:

- financing:
  - basic research carried out in the form of research projects, doctoral scholarships and post-doctoral fellowships,
  - research projects for experienced scientists aiming at implementation of pioneering scientific research;
- international cooperation in the financing of basic research activities;
- dissemination of information about contests announced by the National Science Center;
- supervision over the implementation of the above-mentioned scientific research;
- inspiring and monitoring the financing of basic research with resources coming from outside the state budget;
- other tasks commissioned by the Ministry of Science and Higher Education, including the development of research programs important for national culture.

== Major Grants and Fellowships ==
The National Science Center finances research projects in the field of fundamental, basic, and applied research. Announcements and details can be found on their website. Some of major and available grants and fellowships are:

- PRELUDIUM – pre-doctoral fellowships.
- ETIUDA – doctoral scholarships.
- SONATINA – competition for a research project and internship at a foreign research center, designed for researchers up to 3 years after obtaining Ph.D.s.
- SONATA – competition for research projects carried out by early career researchers who obtained Ph.D.s not earlier than 7 years before the grant submission.
- SONATA BIS – competition for research projects aimed at establishing a new scientific team implemented by persons with an academic degree or a scientific title who obtained a doctoral degree from 2 to 12 years before the year of submitting the application.
- OPUS – competition for research projects, including financing the purchase of scientific and research equipments necessary to carry out these projects. It is a general competition open to all scientists.
- HARMONIA – international research projects including international cooperation with a partner from a foreign scientific institution, international programs or initiatives, or projects implemented using large international research facilities.
- MAESTRO – competition for senior researchers for research projects aimed at the implementation of pioneering scientific research, including interdisciplinary ones.
- UWERTURA – fellowships in research teams implementing research from the European Research Council (ERC).
- TANGO – a competition for projects assuming the implementation in practice of economic and social results obtained as a result of basic research.
- POLONEZ – a competition for oversea researchers who want to conduct research in Poland.

The National Science Center also runs competitions in cooperation with other institutions or organizations, such as:

- SYMFONIA – a competition for interdisciplinary research projects carried out by eminent scientists whose research is distinguished by the highest quality, crossing borders between different fields of science, contributing to the new scientific discoveries.
- FUGA – competition for national internships after obtaining the doctoral degree.

== See also ==
- National Centre for Research and Development
- Polish National Agency for Academic Exchange
