= National Centre for Research and Development =

Polish government agency

The National Centre for Research and Development
- Narodowe Centrum Badań i Rozwoju
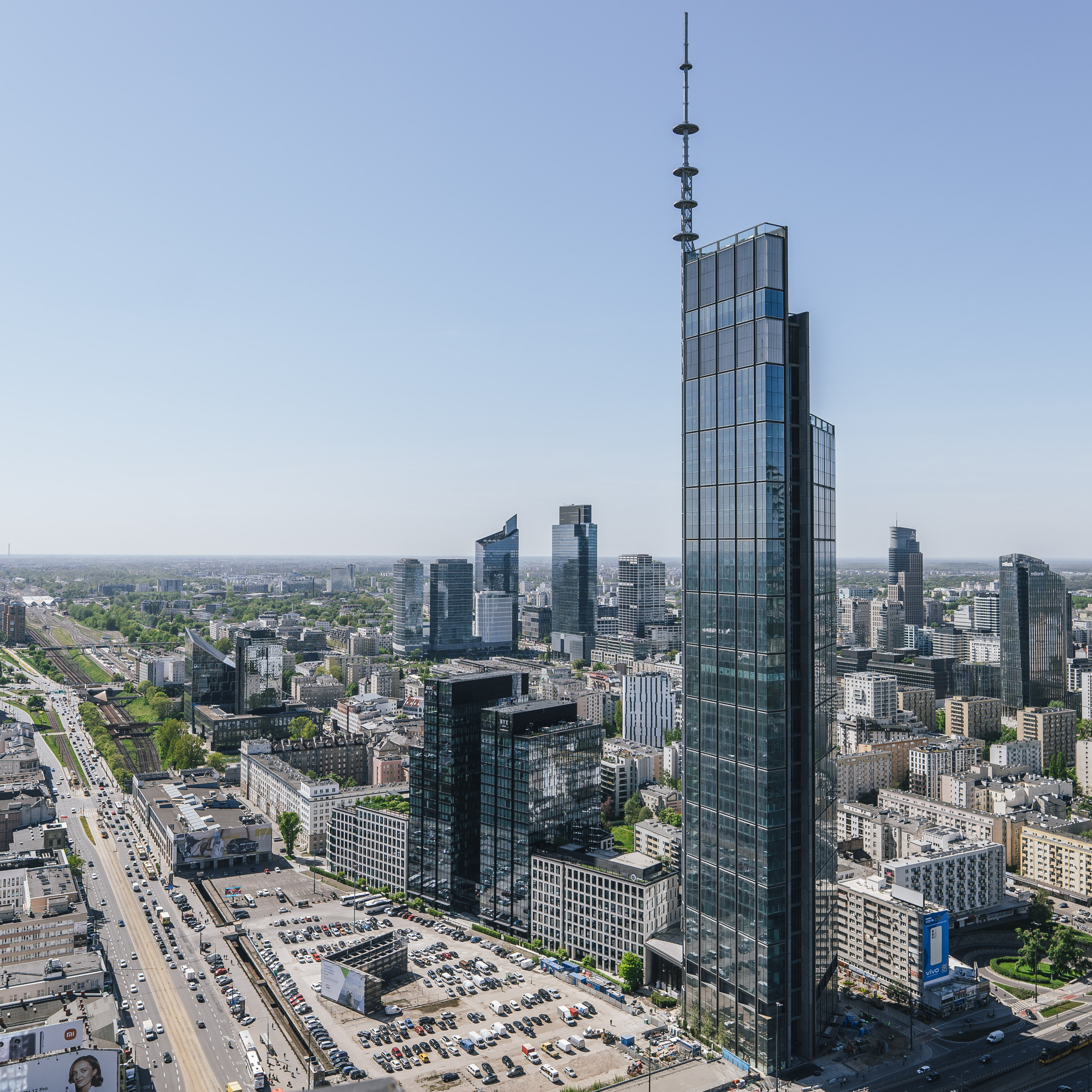
- The Centre's headquarters in Warsaw

Agency overview
- Formed: July 1, 2007; 19 years ago
- Type: Implementing agency
- Headquarters: ul. Chmielna 69, Warsaw, Poland
- Agency executive: Jerzy Małachowski, Acting Director
- Parent agency: Ministry of Science and Higher Education
- Website: www.ncbr.gov.pl

The National Centre for Research and Development (NCRD, Polish: Narodowe Centrum Badań i Rozwoju) is an implementing agency in Poland, as it is understood according to the Act on Public Finance of 27 August 2009, established to carry out tasks within the state policies on science, innovation, as well as science and technology.

== Organisation ==
The Centre's mission is to support Polish companies and science units in developing their abilities to create and make use of solutions based on research results. The above is done for the benefit of the society and to provide a developmental impulse to the Polish economy.

== Summary ==
The chief aim of the Centre is to support the creation of innovative solutions and technologies that increase the competitiveness and innovation of the Polish economy. The NCRD is to strengthen the collaboration between business and academia, leading both to a greater engagement of entrepreneurs in research funding, as well as to a more effective commercialization of this research. While carrying out those tasks, the Centre ensures that public money spent on R&D activities delivers best possible benefits to the Polish economy.

Thanks to its extensive program offer, the NCRD is able to provide financial support for a project on every level of technological readiness – from preliminary industrial research up to the development of an innovative product, service or technology. NCRD programs also include those that fund international intellectual property protection or the foreign expansion of newly established innovative companies.

The NCRD also attaches great importance to supporting young scientists. In agreement with the Ministry of National Defence, the Ministry of Interior and the Internal Security Agency, the NCRD also undertakes activities related to research on Poland’s defense and security. The aim of the programs carried out is not only to increase the potential of Polish scientific and industrial entities, but also to strive for technological independence through the creation of Polish know-how in terms of defence, security and technology.

In carrying out its tasks, the Centre also collaborates with other subjects as well as creates sectoral programs as a direct response to the needs of entrepreneurs from selected areas of the Polish economy. The Centre also attempts to engage VC funds in financing R&D and performs tasks commissioned by the Minister of Science and Higher Education. In 2007, ERANET and EUREKA projects as well as he supervision of commissioned research programs has been passed on to the NCRD.

International co-operation is another significant area of the NCRD’s activities. Since 2011, the NCRD has also been an intermediate body for priorities within the area of supporting higher education and the R&D sector. The budget devoted to R&D has systematically been on the rise and in 2018 amounts to PLN 6.8B.

The NCRD is funded from the State Treasury and EU funds.

== Directors of the NCRD ==
1. Bogusław Smólski, 2 July 2007 – 31 December 2010.
2. Krzysztof Jan Kurzydłowski, 1 January 2011 – 20 January 2016.
3. Maciej Chorowski, 21 January 2016 – 29 July 2019.
4. Wojciech Kamieniecki, 30 July 2019 – 17 February 2022.
5. Remigiusz Kopoczek, 20 July 2022 – 9 August 2022 (since 18 February 2022 as acting director)
6. Paweł Kuch, 9 October 2022 – 9 February 2023
7. Jacek Orzeł, October 2023 – March 2024 (since 9 February 2023 as acting director)
8. Jerzy Małachowski, since 2 March 2024 as acting director

== Legal status ==
Since 1 July 2007, the NCRD has been operating upon the Act on the National Centre for Research and Development of 30 April 2010 (Journal of Laws of 2010, no. 96, item 616).

== See also ==
- The National Science Centre (Poland)
- The Polish National Agency for Academic Exchange
- Polish Development Fund
