= Paweł Borys =

Polish economist

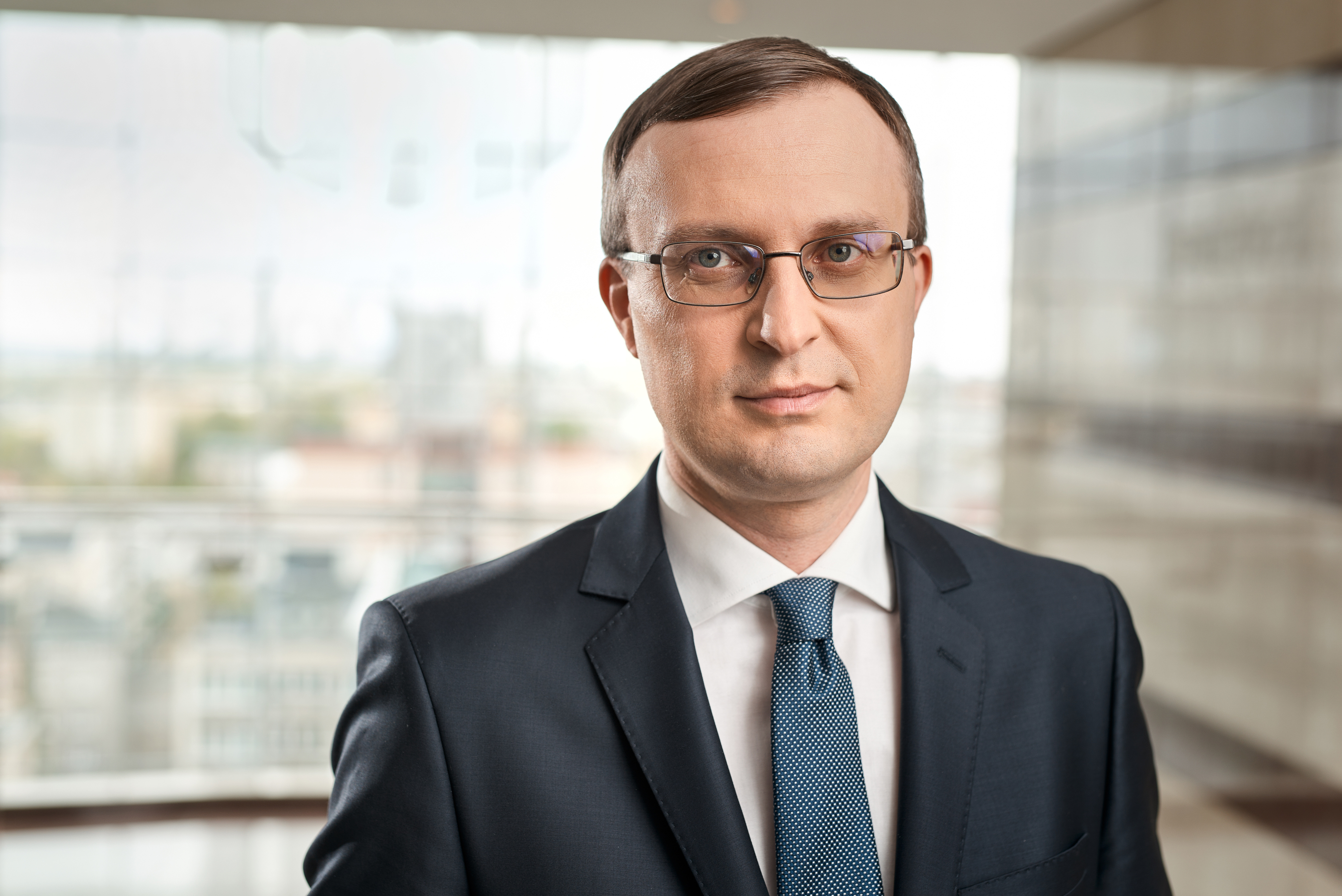

Paweł Borys (born February 21, 1977, in Jelenia Góra) is a Polish economist, specializing in finance, banking, and economic policy.

== Education and career ==
Borys has a master's degree in economics from the Warsaw School of Economics.

Borys is the president of the management board of the Polish Development Fund (PFR) and the chairman of the supervisory board of Bank Gospodarstwa Krajowego (BGK), Poland's State Development Bank. Borys previously held leadership positions at PKO BP, AKJ Capital, Deutsche Bank, and Erste Bank.
