= Szymon Midera =

Polish banker and businessman (born 1975)

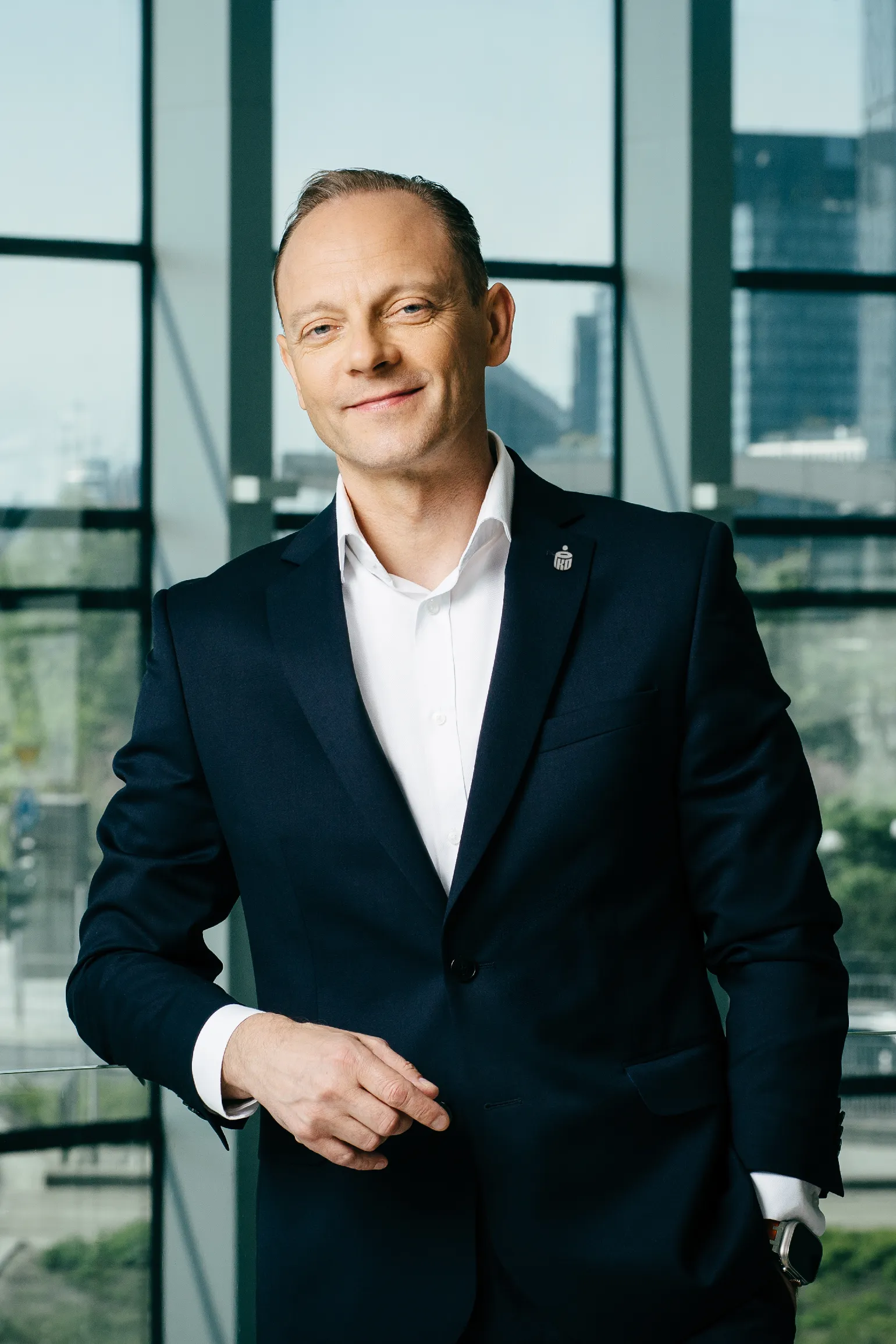
- Szymon Midera in 2024
- Born: Szymon Krzysztof Midera; 7 August 1975 (age 51); Wolbórz, Poland
- Education: University of Łódź; INSEAD
- Occupations: Manager, banker, entrepreneur
- Years active: 2000–present
- Known for: President of the Management Board of PKO Bank Polski (2024–present)
- Title: President of the Management Board, PKO Bank Polski
- Term: 2024–present
- Predecessor: Dariusz Szwed

Szymon Krzysztof Midera (born 7 August 1975) is a Polish manager, banker and entrepreneur. Since 2024 he has served as President of the Management Board of PKO Bank Polski, Poland's largest bank. Between 2015 and 2016 he was President of the Management Board of Bank Pocztowy. In 2016 he co-founded Shumee, a company operating in the cross-border e-commerce sector.

== Biography ==
=== Education ===
Midera graduated in International Economic and Political Relations from the University of Łódź. He also completed the Executive MBA Program at the Faculty of Management of the University of Łódź, organised in cooperation with Towson University and the Robert H. Smith School of Business, as well as the Advanced Management Programme at INSEAD in Fontainebleau.

=== Career ===
During his university years, Szymon Midera worked as a music journalist at Radio Łódź, and from 1996 to 1997 he served as Music Director at Radio Kiks. From 1999 to 2001 he was an advisor to the Łódź Voivodeship.

In 2001 he became advisor to the President of the Management Board of Bank Częstochowa S.A., beginning his career in the banking sector. From 2002 to 2008 he worked at mBank (previously BRE Bank), serving as advisor to the President of the Management Board for communications and press spokesperson, and from 2003 to 2004 as Head of the Communication and Brand Management Unit. In 2005 he was appointed Deputy Director of the Marketing and Investor Relations Department of BRE Bank, and in 2007 Director of the Marketing Office.

Between 2008 and 2015 he served as Vice President, and from 2015 to 2016 as President of the Management Board of Bank Pocztowy. During this period the number of Bank Pocztowy customers grew from approximately 400,000 in 2009 to 1.5 million in 2016.

In 2016, together with two partners, Szymon Midera co-founded Shumee, a company operating in the cross-border e-commerce sector, where he served as President of the Management Board. In April 2025 he sold 100% of his shares.

On 26 March 2024 he was appointed by the Supervisory Board of PKO Bank Polski as President of the Management Board, subject to approval by the Polish Financial Supervision Authority (KNF); pending that approval he served as Vice President of the Management Board leading its operations. On 14 June 2024 the KNF granted its approval, and he formally assumed the office of President.

=== Supervisory board positions ===
- Centrum Operacyjne sp. z o.o. – member of the Supervisory Board (from 2010; the company was struck from the register in 2018)
- Spółka Dystrybucyjna Banku Pocztowego sp. z o.o. – member of the Supervisory Board (from 2010; the company was struck from the register in 2018)
- Pocztowe Towarzystwo Ubezpieczeń Wzajemnych (Postal Mutual Insurance Association) – member of the Supervisory Board
- Pocztowe Towarzystwo Ubezpieczeń na Życie (Postal Life Insurance Association) – member of the Supervisory Board
- PKO Bank Polski S.A. – member of the Supervisory Board, in 2024 seconded to the Management Board as Vice President leading its operations
- Polski Standard Płatności S.A. (operator of the BLIK payment system) – Chairman of the Supervisory Board (since 2024)
- Krajowa Izba Rozliczeniowa S.A. – member of the Supervisory Board, Chairman of the Audit and Risk Committee (since 2024)

=== Public and academic activities ===
Midera was Chairman of the Council of the Łódź Foundation. In December 2020 he became Chairman of the Entrepreneurship Council at the University of Łódź;. He was also a mentor at the Mentors4Starters Foundation.

== Awards and recognition ==
In 2025 Midera received the Srebrny As Bankiera (Silver Ace of Bankier), being included in the list of the most important figures of the Polish financial market compiled by the Bankier.pl portal. On 13 April 2026 he received an award in the Liderzy Świata Finansów (Leaders of the Financial World) competition organised as part of the Banking & Insurance Forum.

== Personal life ==
Midera is a native of Łódź. He has four daughters from his marriage to Anna Midera, President of Łódź Władysław Reymont Airport. He is a long-distance runner.
