= InStreamly =

inStreamly
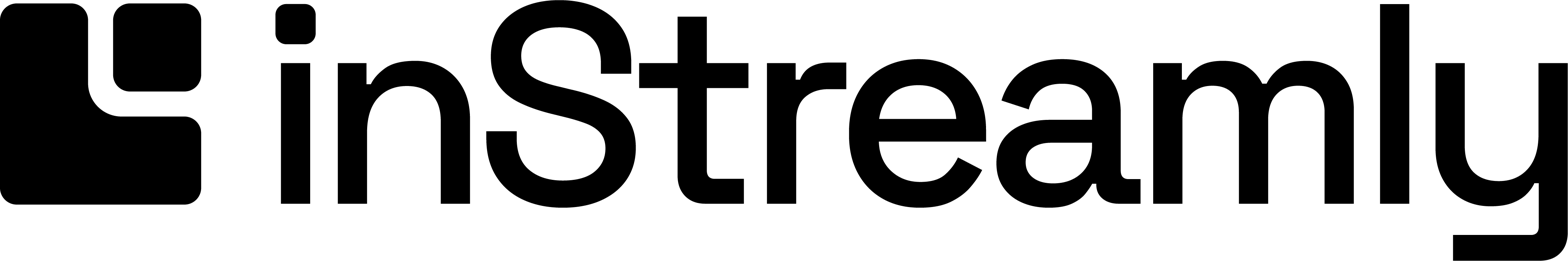
- Industry: Digital marketing, Streaming media
- Founded: 2019
- Headquarters: Warsaw, Poland
- Key people: Maciej Sawicki (CEO)
- Owner: SMOK Ventures, Supernode Global, Colopl Next, PKO VC, hubraum (Deutsche Telekom)
- Website: instreamly.com

inStreamly is a Polish technology platform and company in the digital marketing sector, founded in 2019. It develops technology that allows for automated micro-sponsorships and the simultaneous display of display advertisements during live streaming across multiple independent channels. Aside from its main platform, the company develops supplementary products for the esports and gaming markets and operates internationally.

== History ==
The company was founded in 2019. Its founders are Maciej Sawicki, Damian Konopka, Szymon Kubiak, and Wiktoria Wójcik. Prior to establishing inStreamly, the founders were professionally active in the esports and gaming market. Maciej Sawicki had previously managed the production house Foszer Sawicki and was involved in the esports sector as a commentator and co-owner of the devils.one organization.

== Operations and products ==
The company's primary product is the inStreamly platform, which operates on a micro-sponsorship model. The software allows streamers to connect automatically with advertisers. During broadcasts, streamers display advertising graphics and animations. Advertising materials are matched to the broadcast using contextual technologies, in-game analysis, the streamer's speech, or chat history.

The system allows both micro- and macro-streamers to generate revenue without the need for large contracts with streaming platforms. The tool integrates with live streaming services such as Twitch, YouTube, and Kick. Advertisements broadcast through the platform are primarily directed at Generation Z audiences. According to industry data, the average click-through rate (CTR) for campaigns conducted through the platform was approximately 4%, while the market average for display advertising was 0.7%.

The company develops several supplementary products:

- Streamcoi – a streamer management tool for managers and esports teams (used by organizations such as G2 Esports and Furia);
- Genki – a loyalty program based on commissions from fan purchases;
- Streamers Global – an aggregator of news and statistics concerning the live streaming market;
- New Game + – a marketing agency focused on the gaming sector.

Since 2021, inStreamly has developed advertising products embedded directly within video games and the metaverse. The company also authored the industry report Live Streaming Trends 2025, which was cited by industry media including NowyMarketing.pl and Marketer+.

== Market presence ==
Between 2023 and 2024, the platform was active in over 20 markets, including Poland, Germany, France, Japan, and Brazil. The service operates under its own brand and in a white-label model. Local versions include WARRIOR STREAMING in Brazil, StreamAdvisor in Ukraine, and StreamPot in Japan. More than 100,000 registered streamers have utilized the platform.

Marketing campaigns through inStreamly have been conducted for over 230 brands, resulting in more than 40,000 micro-sponsorship contracts. Clients include Netflix, Samsung, Sony PlayStation, and G2 Esports.

== Funding ==
In 2020, inStreamly secured its first funding round of 1 million PLN from SMOK Ventures, which was allocated toward technology development and international expansion.

In 2021, the company closed an investment round of 4.8 million PLN. Participants included the British fund Supernode Global, the Japanese fund Colopl Next, and PKO VC. In 2022, the company received further investment from hubraum, a fund owned by Deutsche Telekom.

== Recognition ==
- In 2022, co-founder Wiktoria Wójcik was included on the European Forbes 30 Under 30 list in the Media & Marketing category.
- In 2024, the company was awarded at the IAB MIXX Awards 2024 in the Commerce category for the campaign "PSHHH! IT'S GAME TIME – Pepsi x Pyszne.pl x Fortnite". The company is also a member of the employers' association IAB Polska.
- In 2025, inStreamly received the Channel Excellence Award – Influencer Marketing & PR at the EMMA Awards 2025 for the "Dew It Anyway!" campaign for PepsiCo.
- The company was listed in the "Top 100 Poland Startups to Watch in 2026" by Failory.
