= 1979 Warsaw gas explosion =

1979 gas explosion in Warsaw, Poland

Coordinates: 52°13′50″N 21°00′44″E

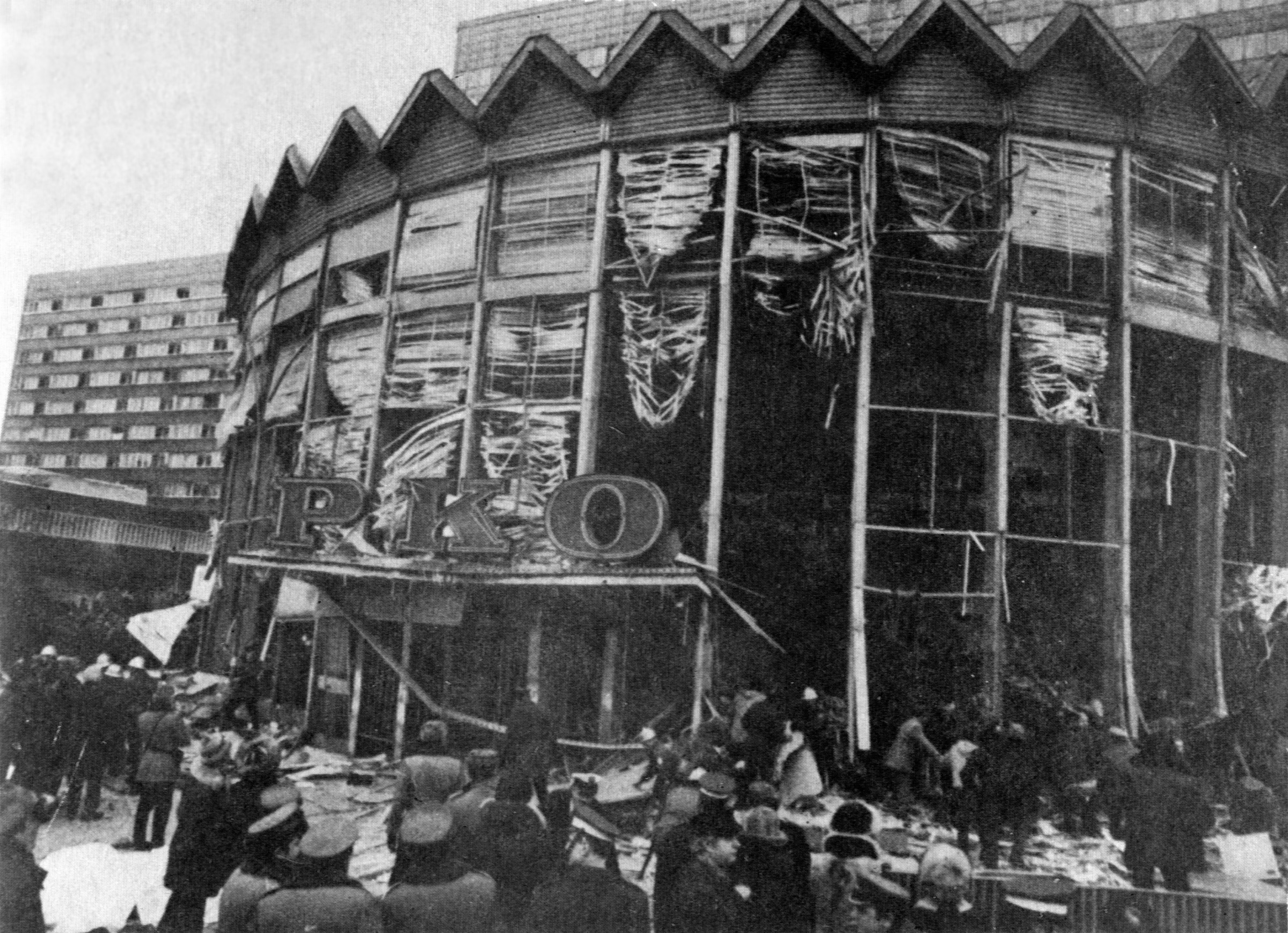
- Warsaw's PKO Rotunda after the 1979 explosion
- Date: 15 February 1979
- Time: 12:37 p.m
- Location: Warsaw, Poland (intersection of Marszałkowska Street and Aleje Jerozolimskie)
- Deaths: 49
- Injuries: 135
- Property damage: PKO Rotunda building

The 1979 explosion at PKO Bank Polski's Rotunda office in Warsaw took place on 15 February 1979, at 12:37 p.m. As a result, 49 people died and 135 were injured. Officially, the disaster was caused by a gas explosion, but in the course of time much speculation appeared, and Varsovians talked among themselves that the building had been blown up by a bomb.

== Background ==
The winter of 1978/1979 was very harsh in Poland, and due to the extreme temperatures and heavy snowfall it was dubbed "the winter of the century". Transport in the country came to a standstill, in poorly heated apartments in Warsaw the temperature at night dropped to 7 degrees Celsius, public mood was at a very low level, and the Warsaw poet Tomasz Jastrun, who kept a diary at that time, said: "People were expecting changes. They were convinced that the current situation had to come to an end, and something would happen. Before the change, people said, there would be signs. One of these signs was the Rotunda explosion".

== The explosion ==
15 February 1979, was a cold, cloudy day. At 12:37 p.m., the bank's branch at the Rotunda, located in the city centre at the intersection of Marszałkowska Street and Aleje Jerozolimskie, was full of people. The explosion took place twenty minutes before the end of the first shift. At that time, there were 170 PKO employees and around 300 customers in the building. Suddenly, as witnesses later stated, the Rotunda floated in the air like a soap bubble, and then broke into pieces. All the glass walls were shattered, and hundreds of pieces of glass fell onto the sidewalks. Inside the building, floors collapsed into the basement. The explosion was so loud that it was heard by thousands of Varsovians.

Seventy percent of the Rotunda was destroyed and emergency crews immediately began searching for people buried under the rubble. The last living person was found three hours after the explosion, but some 2,000 workers continued the search for as long as seven days afterward. The building, which was made of reinforced concrete, fell inwards, creating a giant crater. Among the survivors were two female employees of the bank's safe. The safe itself, located in the basement, was intact.

== Search and rescue operation ==
The central location of the Rotunda made an immediate search and rescue operation possible. Altogether 2,000 people participated in it, commanded by Edward Gierski of the Warsaw Fire Department. Day after day, new bodies were recovered from the ruins. On 17 February, four victims were found, on 19 February, two. Apart from the firefighters and ambulances crews, passers-by also helped. Blood was donated in a temporary medical office, located at the nearby Hotel Forum (currently Novotel Warszawa Centrum). The Zodiak restaurant offered hot meals to the rescuers, hundreds of liters of blood were collected, and witnesses remember terrifying scenes, such as a woman in a blue dress, without an arm.

A reporter from Express Wieczorny was on the spot within a few minutes, and the newspaper covered the explosion widely.

== Cause ==
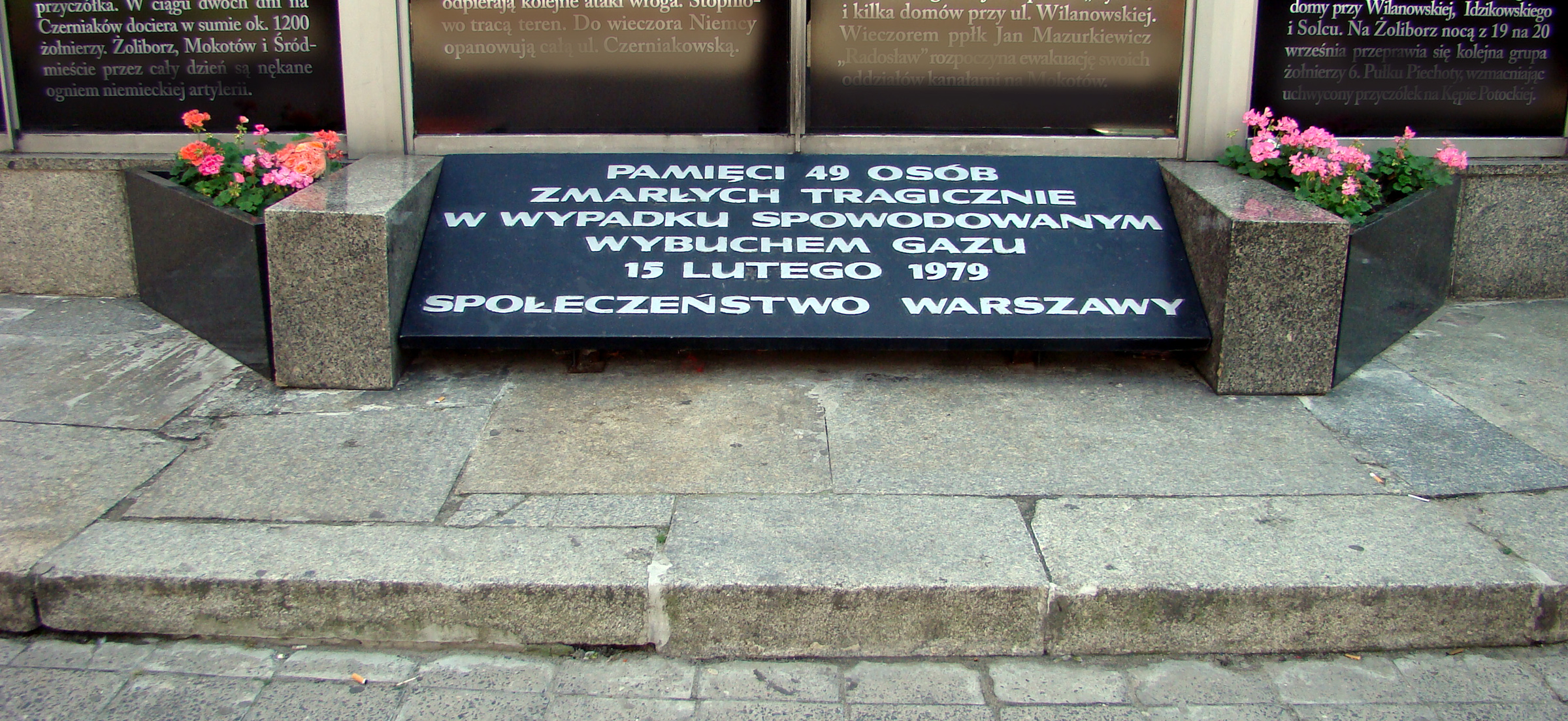
Memorial plate for victims of explosion of 15 February 1979

Immediately after the explosion, numerous rumors and speculation appeared. Warsaw newspapers wrote about the incident, but people, accustomed to Communist propaganda, did not believe in any official explanations. The most common was the rumor about a bomb, planted by the main cashier of the bank, who had embezzled large sums of money and caused the explosion to destroy all evidence. A similar rumor stated that the bomb was planted by cronies of a high-ranking Communist party official, who had stolen hundreds of thousands of zlotys.

Another rumor stated that the explosion was caused by robbers, who tried to get to the underground safe from a rail tunnel. They planted a bomb to open the wall of the safe, but miscalculated its power. Satirist Michał Ogórek says that people were also talking among themselves that the incident was part of an inner-party conspiracy, aimed at Edward Gierek and his cabinet. One final rumor stated that the explosion was caused by a mysterious anti-Communist organization, which wanted to blow up the building at midnight, when it was empty, but messed up the timing.

The real cause of the explosion was a gas leak from a damaged pipe located underneath the sidewalk. The gas got into an underground telephone connection and gathered in the basement of the Rotunda. Frozen water and snow clogged all the air vents, and in those circumstances, one spark or the turning on of a light in the basement, was enough to ignite the powerful explosion.

Several people, however, still do not believe in this explanation. Edward Gierski, who commanded the search and rescue operation, also has doubts: "Despite all official reports and photos of damaged valves, I am still not sure if the explosion was caused by leakage in a gas pipe. I saw the foundation of the building, which was one meter thick. It broke in half, and it is difficult for me to believe that an underground gas explosion would have caused such destruction".

== Victims and aftermath ==
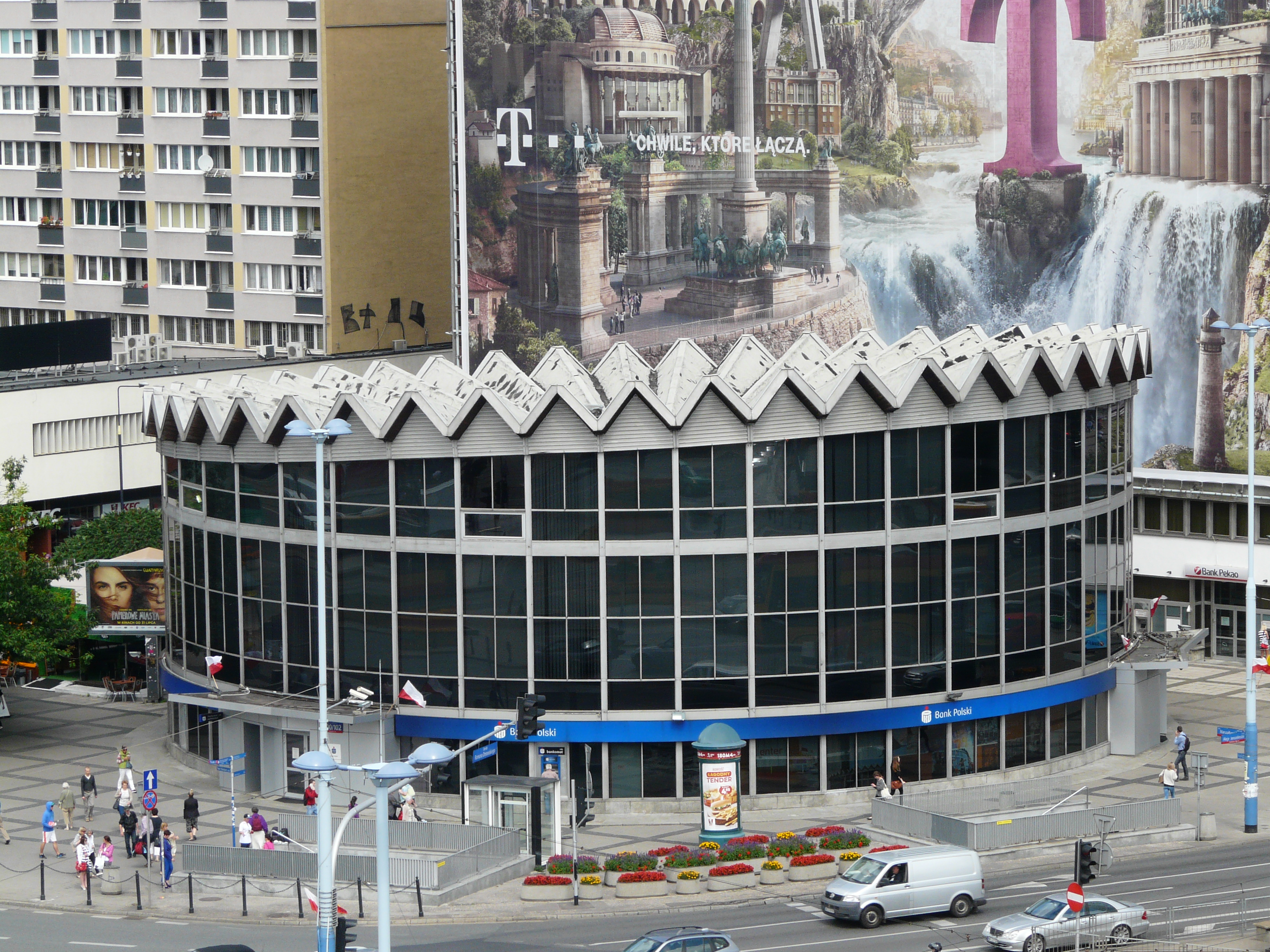
PKO Rotunda in 2015

A list of victims was published in all the Warsaw newspapers, and condolences were sent by Edward Gierek and Soviet leader Leonid Brezhnev. Every year on the anniversary of the explosion, the management of PKO Bank Polski organizes a special celebration, which is attended by families of the victims, Warsaw authorities and the bank's managers. Furthermore, there is a commemorative plaque, placed in the northern wall of the complex.

The decision to rebuild the Rotunda was announced by newspapers as early as 17 February. The government of Poland regarded it as a priority, so hundreds of workers cleaned the site and then started construction. Originally, re-opening was scheduled for 22 July 1979, which in Communist times was a national holiday. The project was overseen by a co-designer of the original Rotunda, Piotr Zajlich, who introduced several changes in construction, including with the wiring and the usage of offices. The Rotunda was officially reopened in late October 1979, but most of the survivors of the explosion chose not to return to work in that location. Families of the victims received financial compensation in the amount equal to the then-price of a Fiat 126.

== See also ==
- List of Poland disasters by death toll
- List of pipeline accidents
