= Zbigniew Jagiełło =

Polish banker (born 1964)

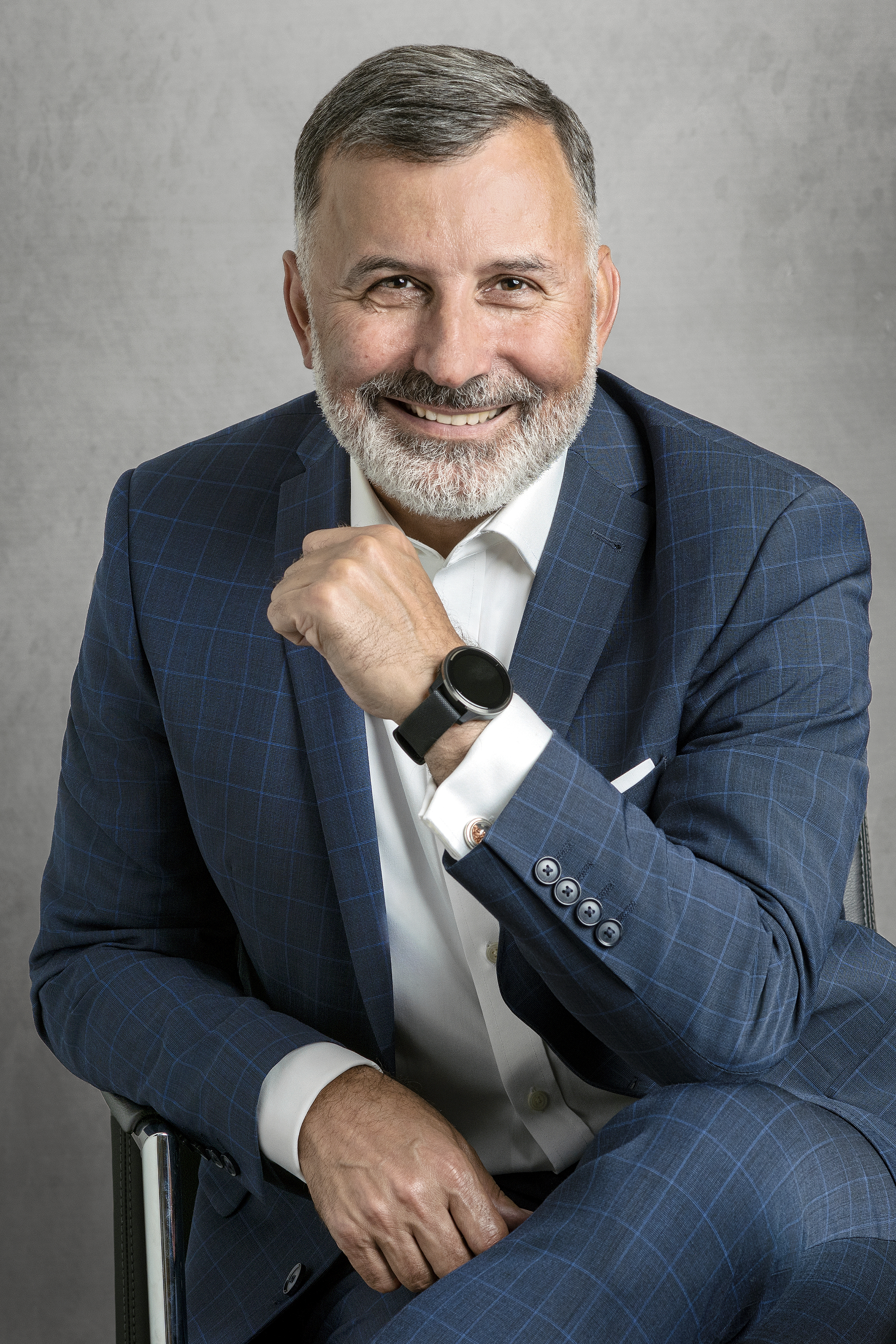
- Born: 23 January 1964 (age 61); Strzelin, Poland
- Title: President, PKO Bank Polski
- Term: October 2009–present

Zbigniew Jagiełło (born 23 January 1964) is a Polish banker. He was appointed President of the Management Board of Bank PKO Bank Polski in October 2009. He is also the Vice Chairman of the Supervisory Board of Bank Pocztowy S.A. and Board Member of the Association of Polish Banks.

== Career ==
He is a graduate (Master of Engineering) of the Faculty of Information Technology and Management of Wroclaw University of Technology and earned his Executive MBA diploma at the Gdansk Foundation for Management Development, University of Gdansk certified by the Rotterdam School of Management, Erasmus University.

Mr. Jagiełło has been professionally active on the Polish financial market since 1995. He commenced work at Pioneer First Polish Investment Fund Company managing the Wroclaw regional office. At the end of 1996, he moved to Warsaw, where he co-founded PKO/Credit Suisse TFI S.A., first as sales and distribution director, and later as Vice President of the Management Board. Within 4 years, he created – as part of Bank PKO Bank Polski – the first Polish banking investment fund distribution network. In July 2000, he was appointed President of the Management Board of Pekao/Alliance Investment Fund Company, which in mid-2001 – as a result of a merger with Pioneer First Polish Investment Fund Company – changed its name to Pioneer Pekao Investment Fund Company. As President of the Management Board, Zbigniew Jagiello was in charge of building a distribution network of investment funds at Bank Pekao S.A., establishing and strengthening the position of Pioneer Pekao TFI S.A. as market leader. At the same time, since 2005, he held the function of President of the Management Board of Pioneer Pekao Investment Management S.A.

He was also Chairman of the Supervisory Board of Pekao Financial Services sp. z o.o., Vice Chairman of the Supervisory Board of Pekao Pioneer Pension Fund Company, and Member of the Supervisory Board of Ciech S.A., a company listed on the Warsaw Stock Exchange. In the global structure of Pioneer Investments, he was Head of Distribution of the Central and Eastern Europe Region (CEE), where he supervised distribution, marketing, product development and contacts with institutional clients. Furthermore, he held membership in the Supervisory Boards of Pioneer Investments companies located in the Czech Republic, Romania and Hungary. Zbigniew Jagiełło is also actively involved in the development and promotion of high standards of the financial market in Poland. Among others, he headed the Board of the Chamber of Fund and Asset Managers. For his achievements, he was granted the "Rzeczpospolita" Eagle Award in 2007, and named winner of the competition "Polish Business Leader 2007" organised by the Business Center Club. Zbigniew Jagiełło has also been awarded by the President of the Republic of Poland with the Bachelor's Cross of the Order of the Revival of Poland and with the Social Solidarity Medal for promoting the idea of corporate social responsibility.
