= PKO Rotunda =

Coordinates: 52°13′50″N 21°00′45″E

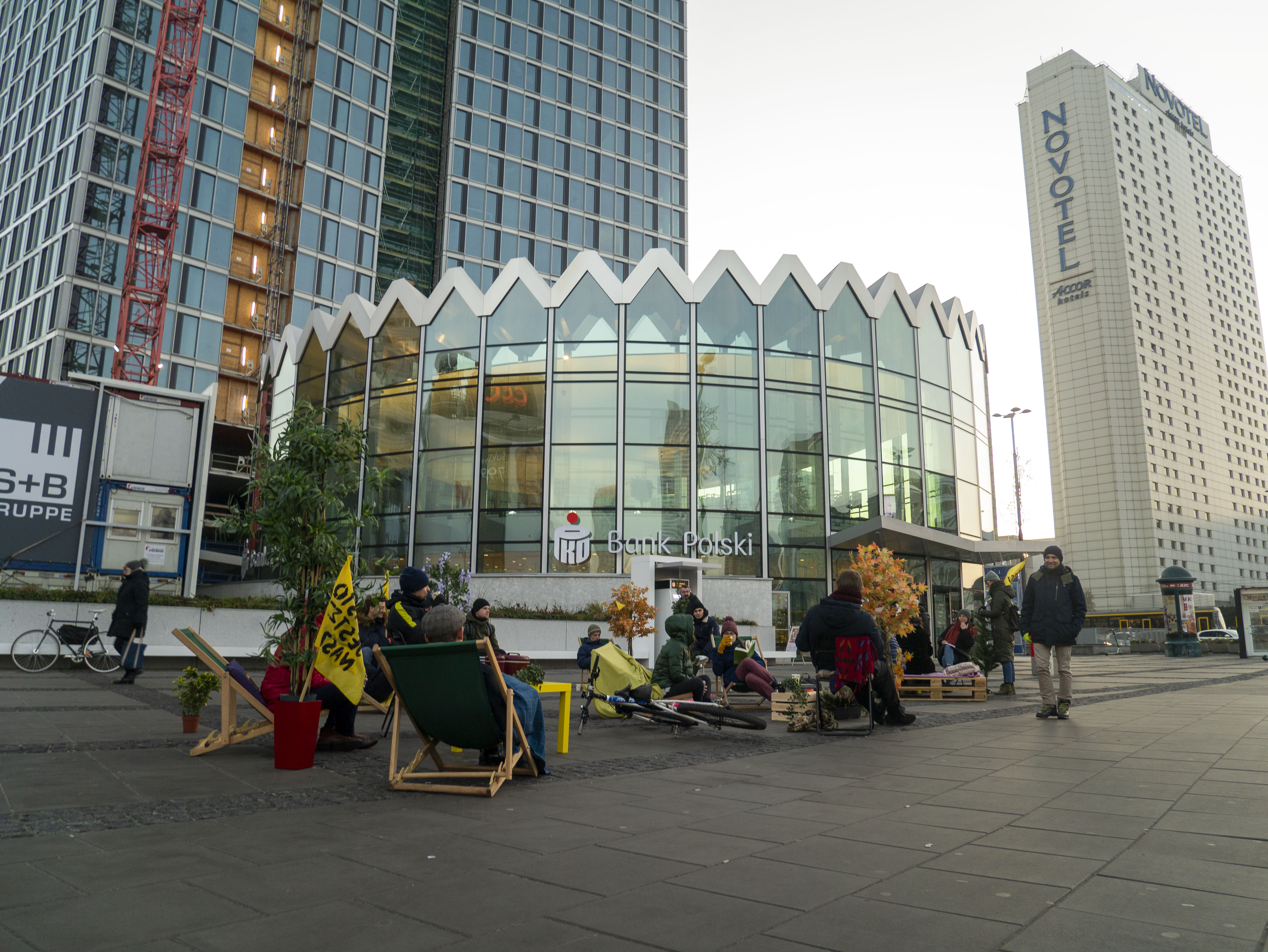
Rotunda PKO in Warsaw

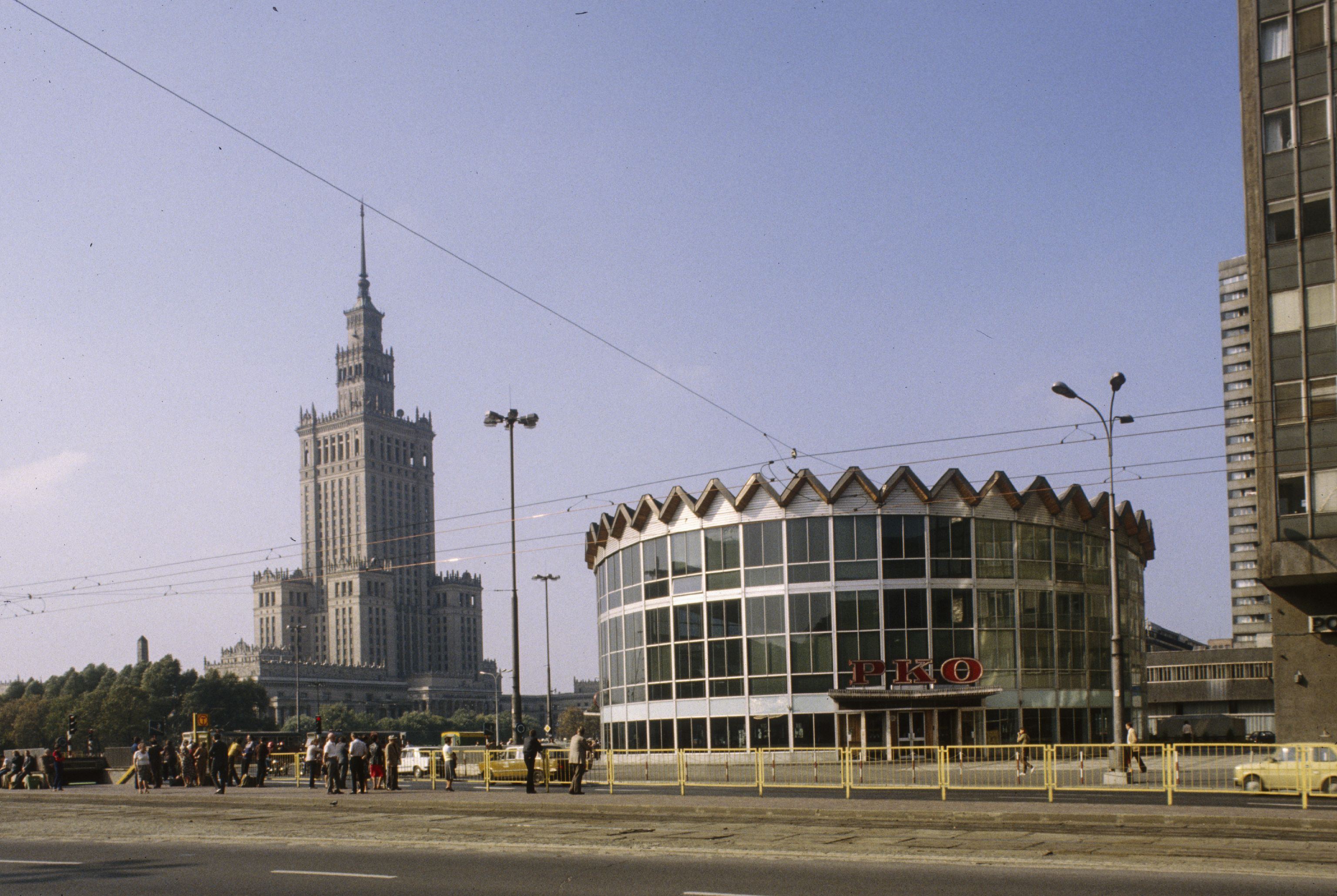
PKO Rotunda in 1981

PKO Rotunda is a rotunda-type building owned by the PKO BP bank in the center of Warsaw, Poland. Designed from 1960–1969 by chief architect Jerzy Jakubowicz, it was the site of a gas explosion in February 1979, which killed 49 people. It was opened again in October the same year.

In 2015 Warsaw officials agreed to demolish the building, although it was an officially recognised monument – it was then believed that the building was fully reconstructed in 1979, after the explosion. The branch was closed on December 23, 2016. In March 2017 the builders were ordered to stop the demolition, as after a few days it was discovered that most of the building construction is, in fact, from the original building. The building was then carefully demolished, but parts of the original constructions (the central element and the roof) were saved in order to be accommodated into the new building.

A new, three-level building in the same shape was opened in November 2019 - with a two-level PKO branch and a coffeeshop at the top floor.
