= Paweł Gruza =

Polish Banker and Politician

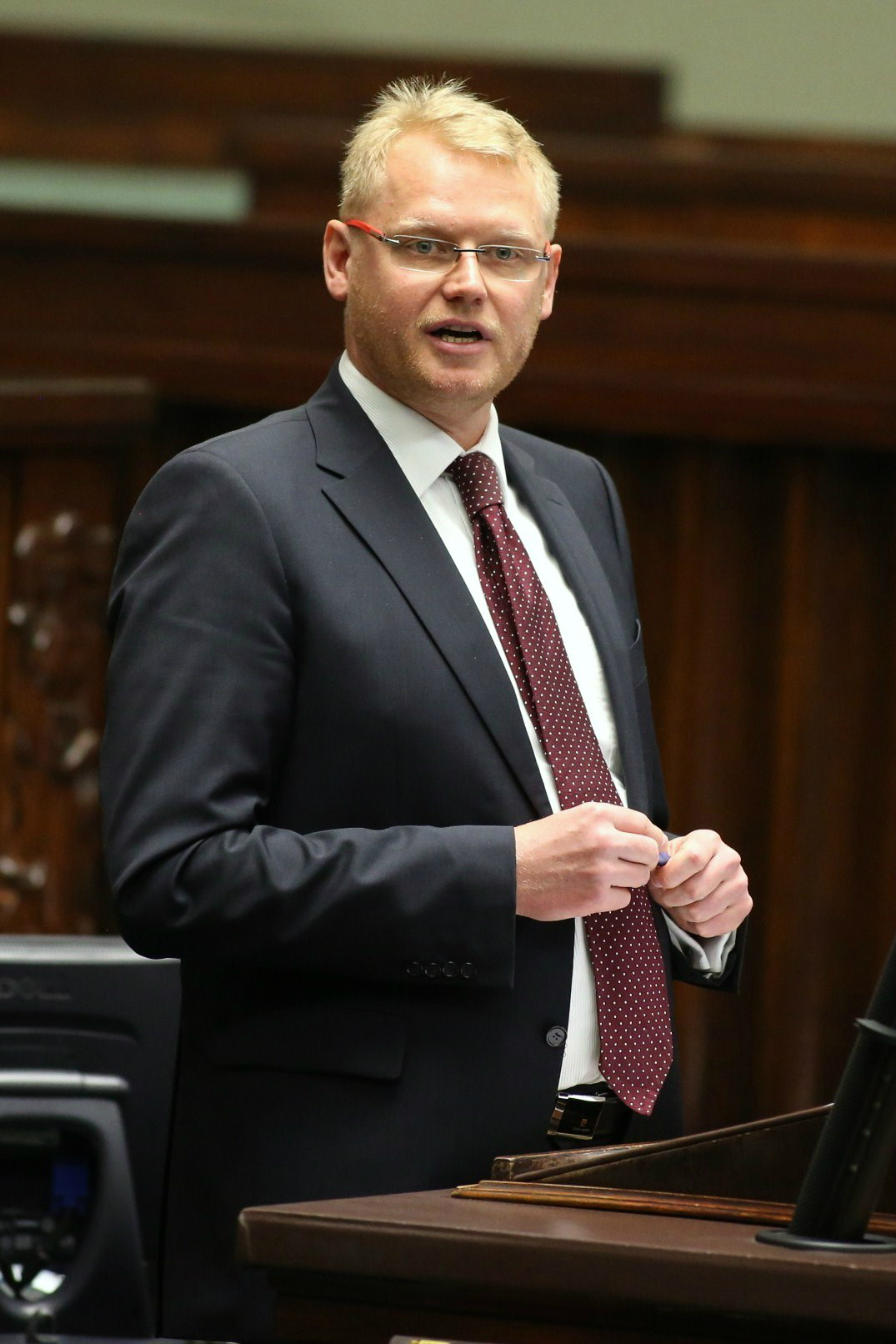
- Gruza in 2017

Acting CEO of PKO Bank Polski
- In office August 2022 – 12 April 2023
- Preceded by: Iwona Duda
- Succeeded by: Dariusz Szwed

Vice-President of the Management Board of KGHM Polska Miedź
- In office September 2018 – August 2022

Deputy Minister of Finance
- In office 2016–2018

Undersecretary of State, Ministry of Treasury
- In office 2016–2016

Personal details
- Born: 1 June 1977 (age 49) Warsaw, Poland
- Education: University of Warsaw
- Occupation: Banker, civil servant

Paweł Gruza (born 1 June 1977) is a Polish banker, politician and former acting CEO of PKO Bank Polski, the largest Polish bank. He also served as Deputy Finance Minister in the Ministry of Finance.

== Early life and education ==
Paweł Gruza was born on 1 June 1977 in Warsaw. He studied law and administration at the University of Warsaw and holds an undergraduate degree there.

== Career ==
=== Ministry of Finance and Ministry of Treasury ===
Paweł Gruza served as Deputy Finance Minister in the Ministry of Finance from 2016 to 2018 and served as Undersecretary of State in the Ministry of Treasury from early to late 2016. Gruza was also a member of the Polish Financial Supervision Authority(KNF).

=== KGHM ===
From September 2018 to August 2022 he held the position of Vice Chairman of the Board of KGHM Polska Miedź, a Polish mining company.

=== PKO Bank Polski ===
From August 2022, Pawel Gruza led the Board of PKO as its newly appointed vice-president until the Polish Financial Supervision Authority(KNF) would give their approval for his role as CEO. In April 2023 Gruza resigned from the position of acting CEO due to the lack of approval from the KNF and was replaced by Dariusz Szwed. Gruza will remain vice-president of the board, but will not manage it anymore.
