= PKO Bank Polski =

Largest Polish banking company

Powszechna Kasa Oszczędności Bank Polski Spółka Akcyjna

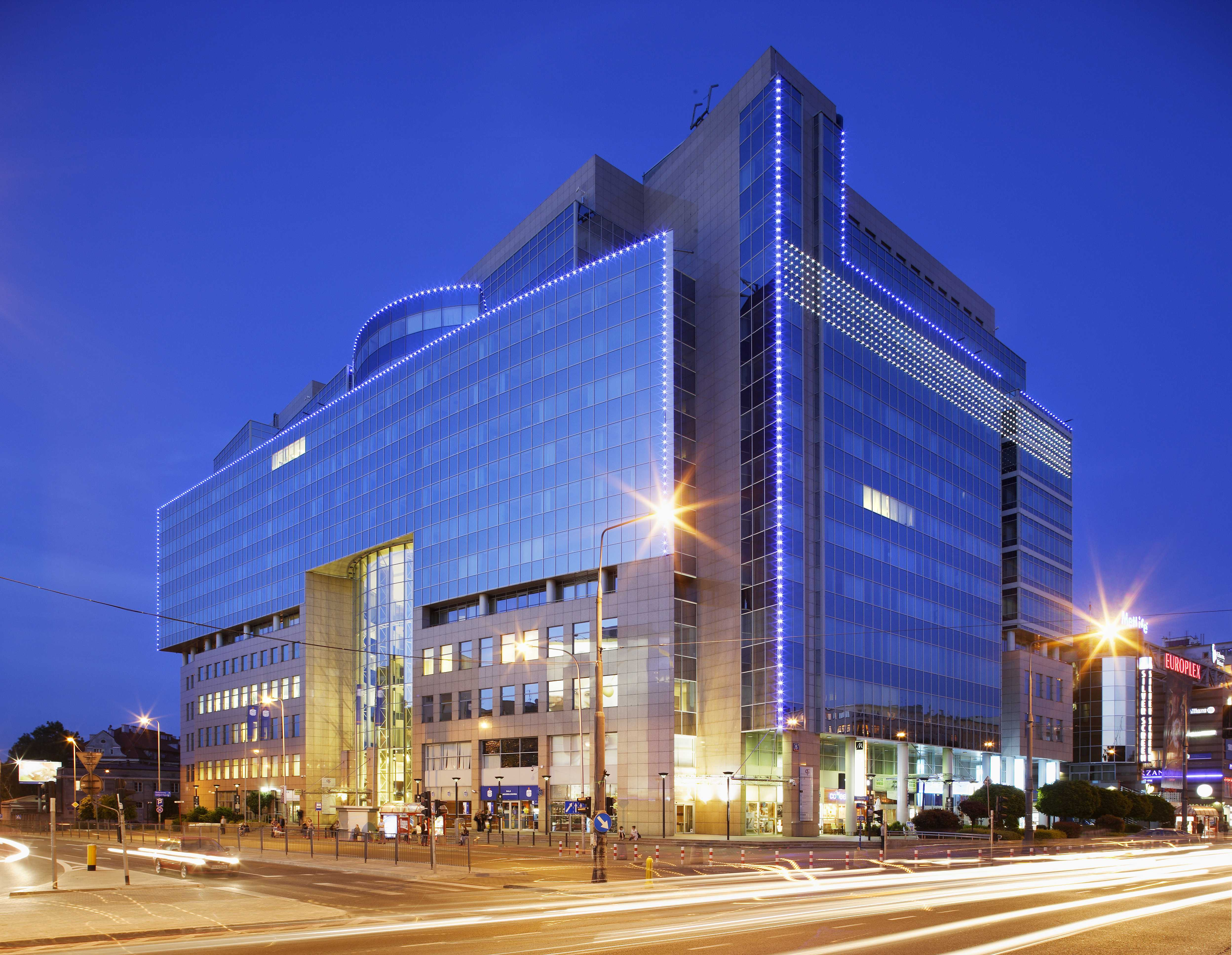
- PKO BP in Warsaw
- Type: Spółka akcyjna
- Traded as: WSE: PKO; WIG30 component
- ISIN: PLPKO0000016
- Industry: Banking, financial services
- Founded: 7 February 1919; 107 years ago (as Pocztowa Kasa Oszczędności); 1948 (as Powszechna Kasa Oszczędności)
- Founder: Józef Piłsudski (Chief of State); Ignacy Paderewski (Prime Minister); Stefan Przanowski (Deputy Prime Minister); Hubert Linde (Minister of Posts and Telegraphs)
- Headquarters: Warsaw, Poland
- Key people: Szymon Midera (President of the Management Board)
- Products: Consumer banking, corporate banking, finance and insurance, investment banking, mortgage loans, private banking, private equity, savings, securities, asset management, wealth management, credit cards
- Net income: ▲10.682 billion zł (2025)
- Total assets: ▲583.1 billion zł (2025)
- Number of employees: 26,300 (Note: Figure for the PKO Bank Polski S.A. Capital Group.) (FTE, 2025)
- Website: www.pkobp.pl

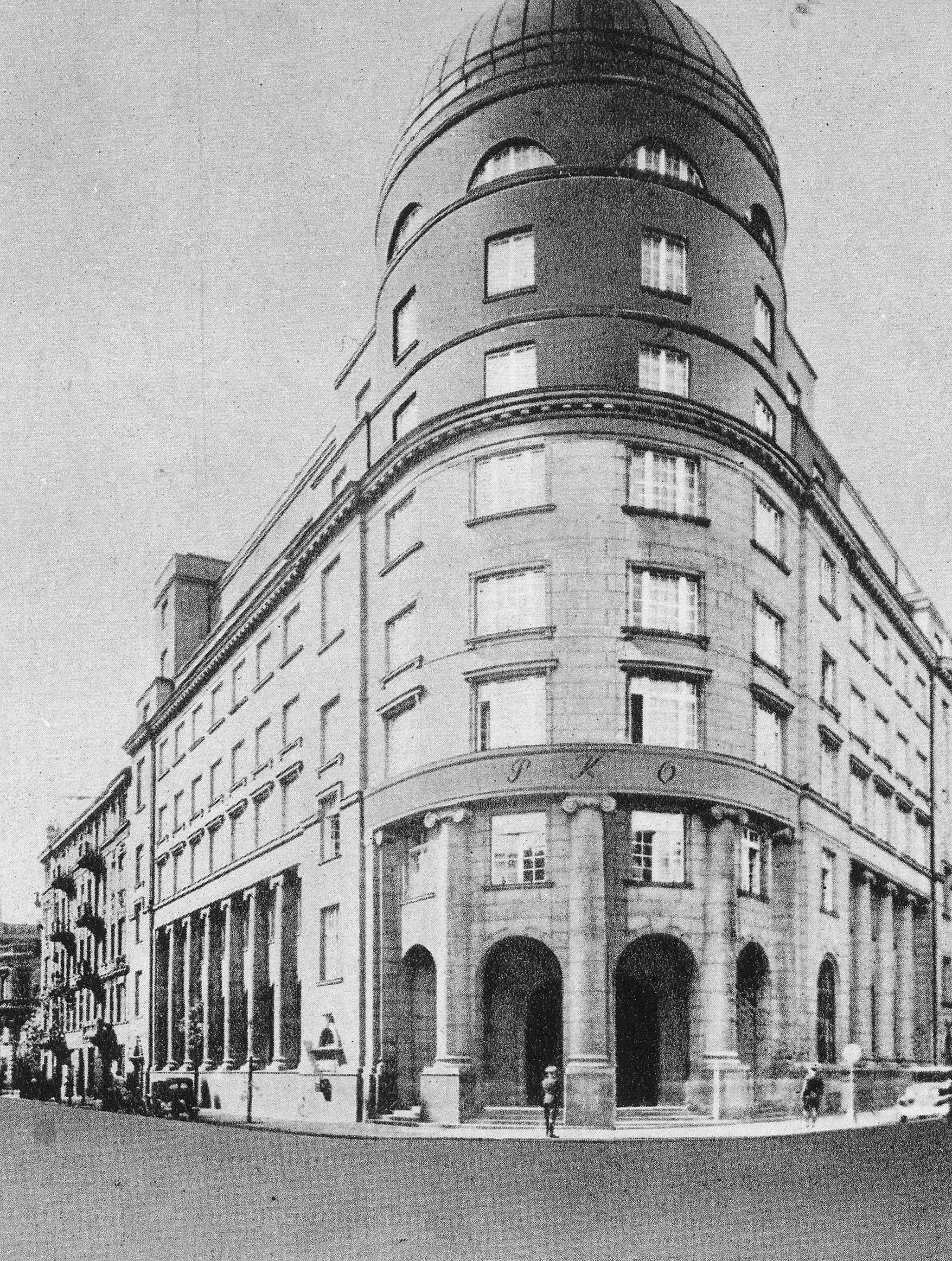
PKO head office on Świętokrzyska Street in Warsaw in the 1930s

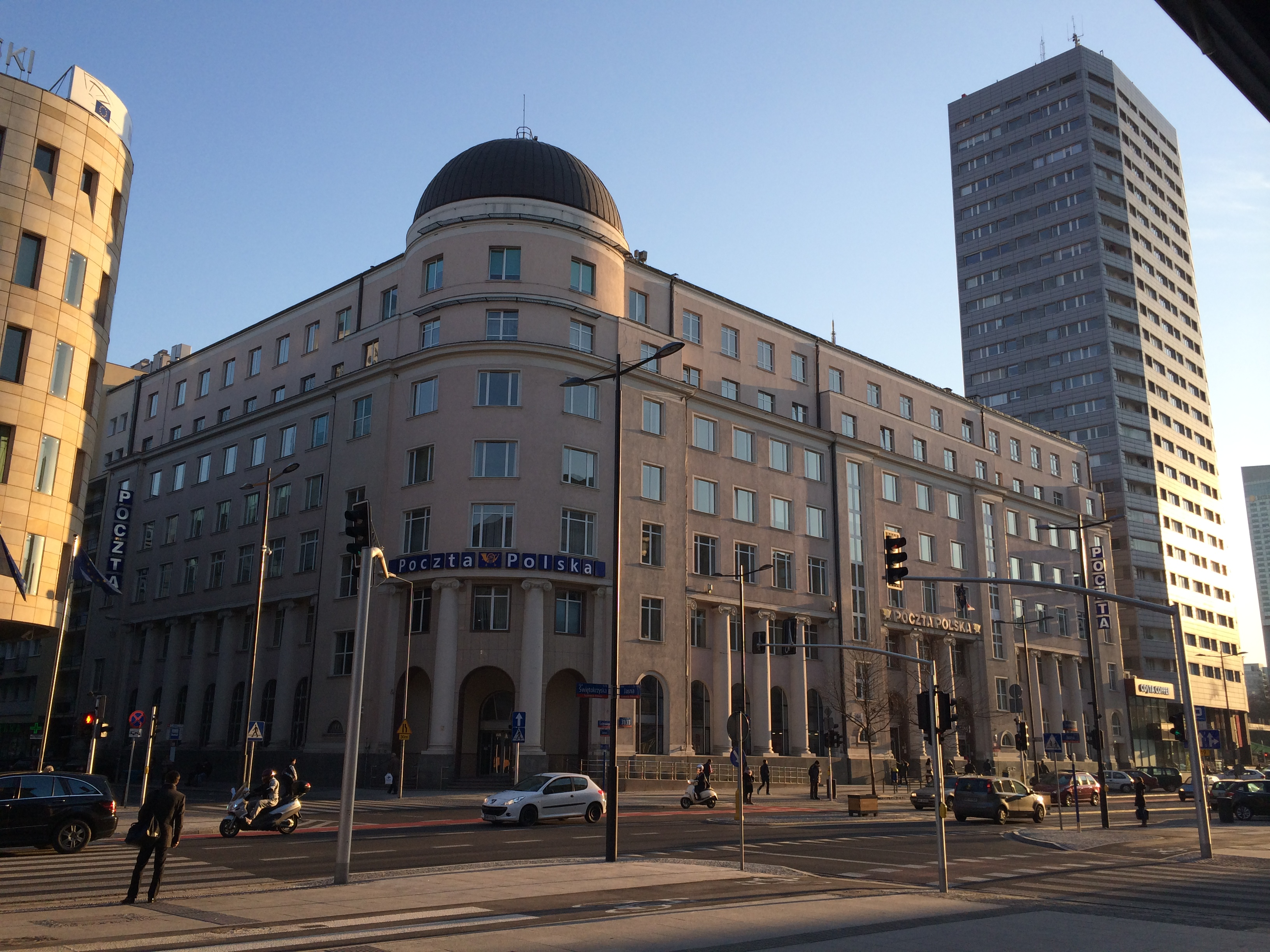
The same building in 2015, used by Polish Post

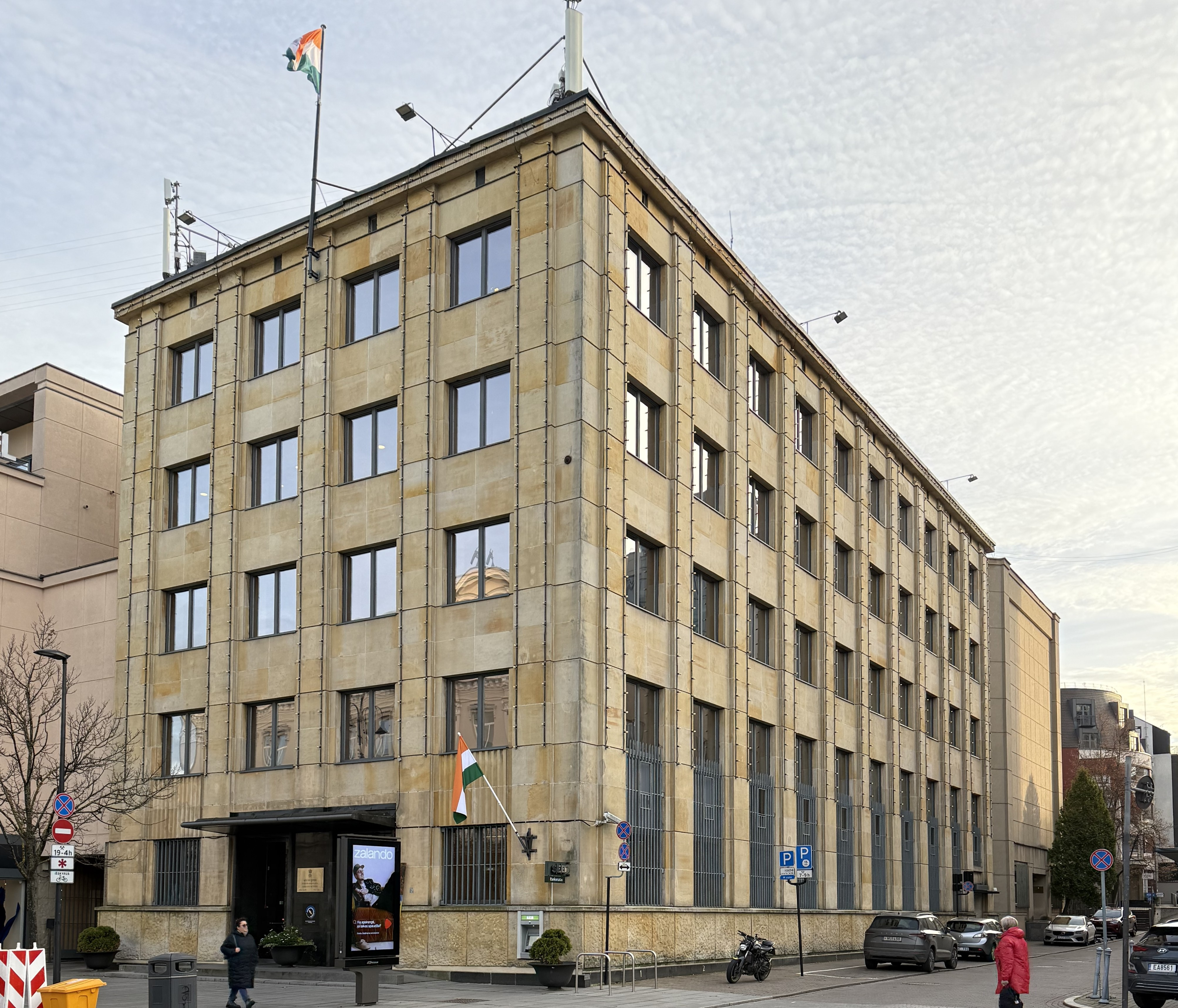
Former PKO building in Vilnius, erected 1836-1937

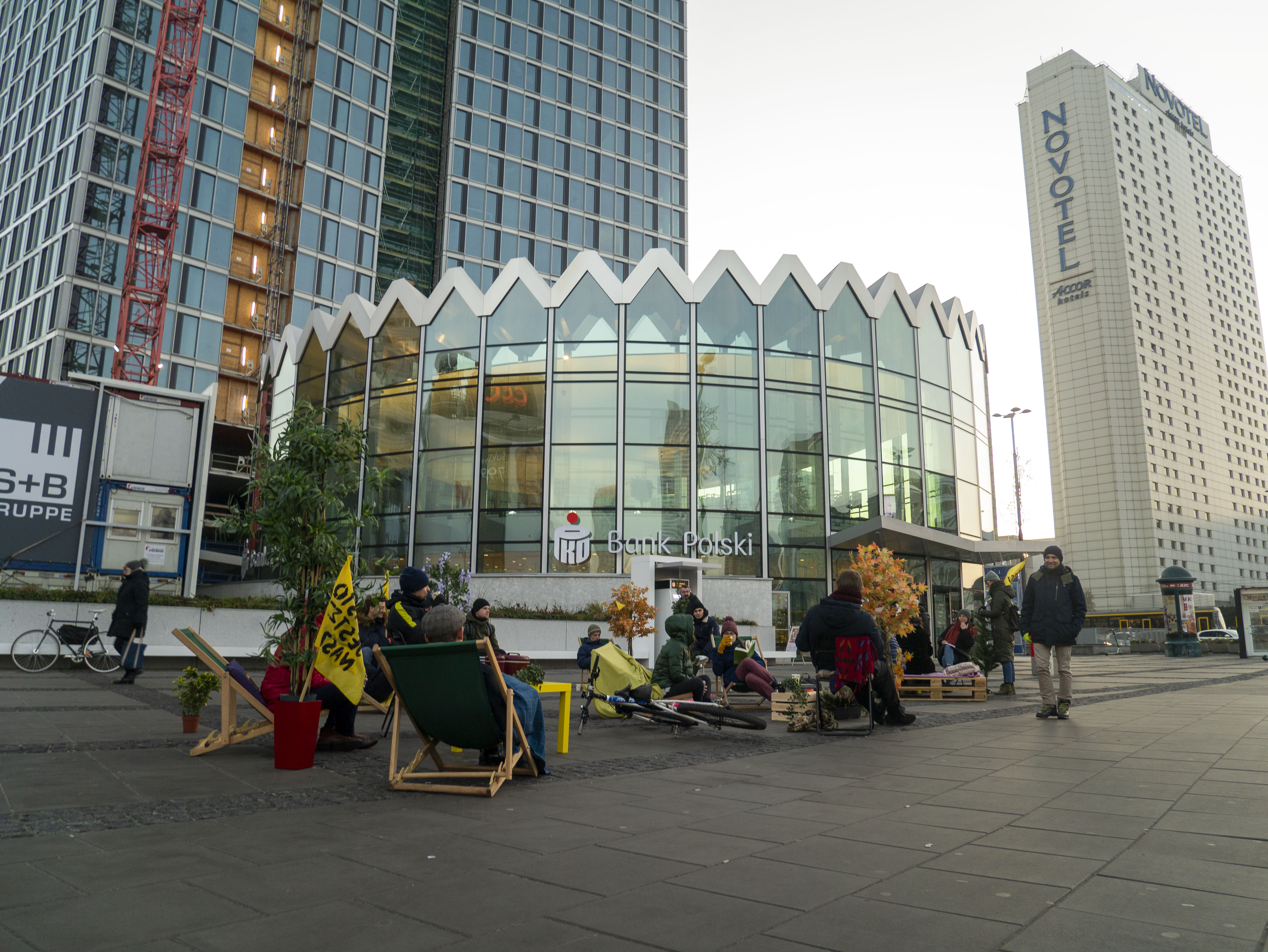
PKO Rotunda in Warsaw

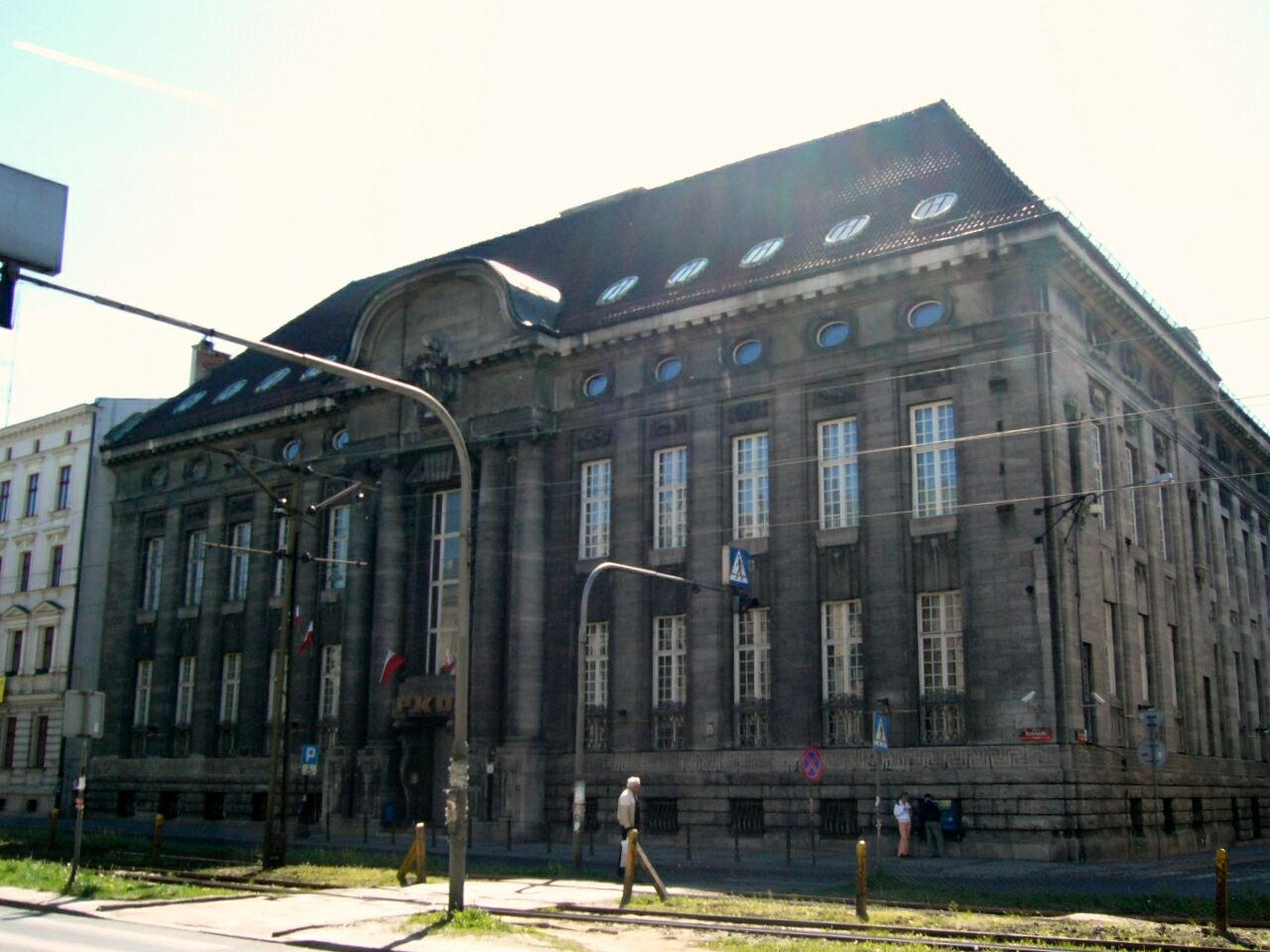
PKO building in Łódź, originally Łódzki Bank Handlowy

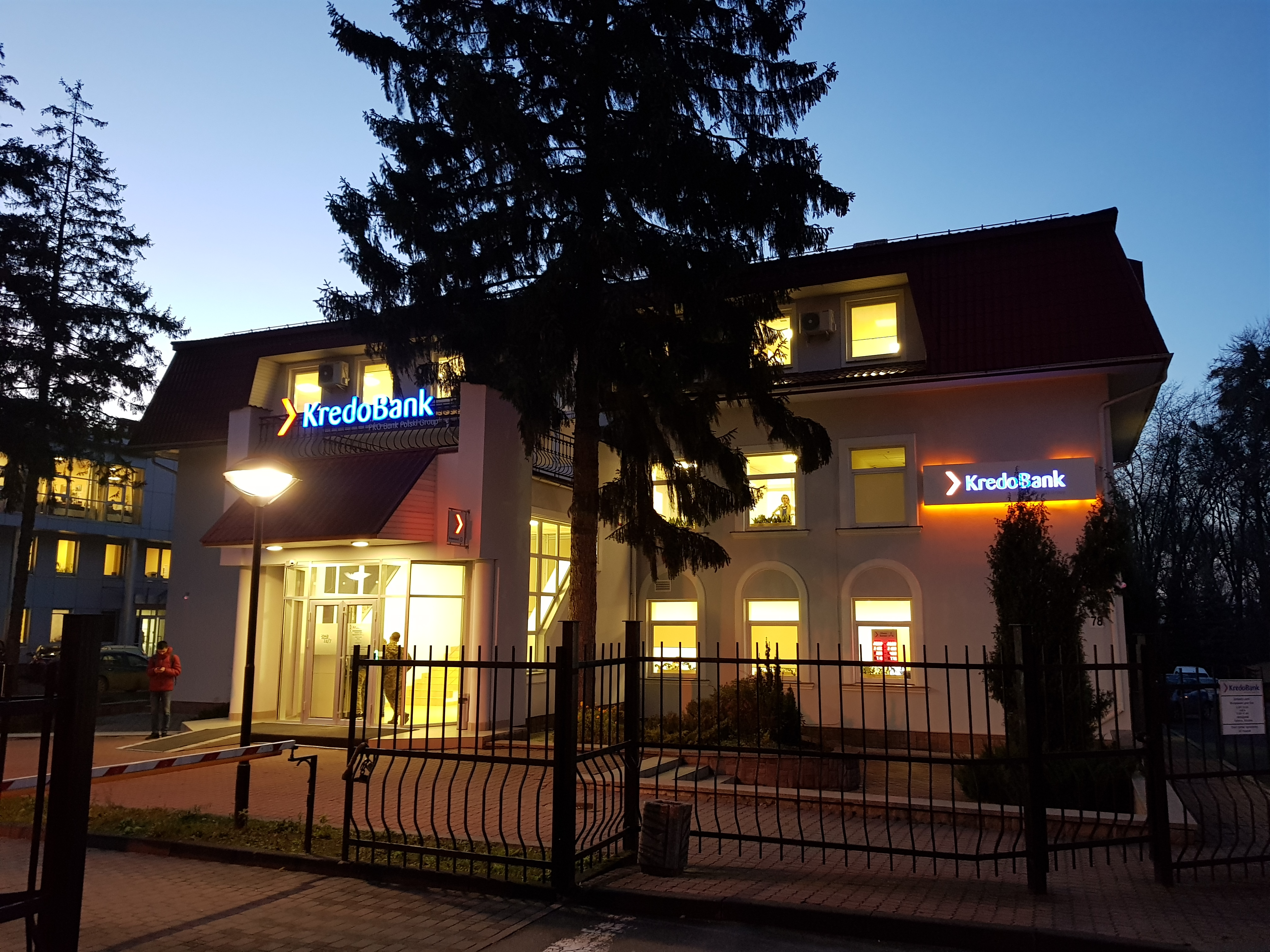
KredoBank in Lviv, PKO's subsidiary in Ukraine

Powszechna Kasa Oszczędności Bank Polski Spółka Akcyjna or PKO Bank Polski S.A. (lit. 'General Savings Bank – Bank of Poland'), in short PKO BP or simply PKO, is a multinational banking and financial services company headquartered in Warsaw, Poland. It is the largest universal bank in Poland and one of the largest financial institutions in Central and Eastern Europe. Its history dates back to 1919 and the establishment of Pocztowa Kasa Oszczędności.

PKO BP provides services to both individual and business clients, including investment banking and private banking, and through its subsidiaries offers other financial services. The bank owns the Ukrainian KredoBank.

The bank's main shareholder is the State Treasury. It has been listed on the Warsaw Stock Exchange since 2004. In 2024, PKO BP entered the list of Europe's 50 largest banks by assets compiled by S&P Global Market Intelligence (50th place). In 2025, it ranked 525th on the Forbes Global 2000 list of the world's largest companies.

== History ==
=== Postal Savings Bank (1919–1948) ===
On 7 February 1919, by decree of the Provisional Head of State Józef Piłsudski, the Pocztowa Kasa Oszczędności (Postal Savings Bank) was established. Hubert Linde was appointed its first director on 28 December 1919. He was succeeded as presidents of PKO by Emil Schmidt and Henryk Gruber. The bank's head office was established in Warsaw at 31/33 Świętokrzyska Street, along with the first local branches in Kraków, Lwów, Łódź, Poznań and Katowice. A primary objective of the bank was to introduce the Polish złoty into circulation in place of the Polish mark. From 1920, the bank had legal personality as a state institution. Its employees were members of the Pocztowa Kasa Oszczędności Employees' Association, which maintained branches at larger offices, including Warsaw and Łódź.

During the German occupation of Poland in World War II, the bank operated under German administration. Its operations were resumed in 1945.

=== Powszechna Kasa Oszczędności in the People's Republic of Poland ===
By the decree of the Council of Ministers of 25 October 1948 on banking reform, the existing Pocztowa Kasa Oszczędności was dissolved and a new state-owned bank — Powszechna Kasa Oszczędności — was established in its place. Under that decree, on 19 December 1949 the Minister of the Treasury issued two regulations on the new bank: one on the commencement of its operations, and a second on the transfer of branches, assets and liabilities from Pocztowa Kasa Oszczędności and the placing of the latter into liquidation. On 1 January 1950, Powszechna Kasa Oszczędności commenced operations and took over the assets and liabilities of the liquidated Pocztowa Kasa Oszczędności.

In the late 1960s, Karol Śliwka designed the PKO logo, which remains in use. In 1974, PKO's product range was expanded to include a savings and current account for private individuals (commonly known as ROR).

Under the Banking Act of 12 June 1975, with effect from 1 July 1975, Powszechna Kasa Oszczędności was incorporated into the structures of the National Bank of Poland. On 1 November 1987, it became an independent bank again, changing its name to Powszechna Kasa Oszczędności Bank Państwowy. The separation from the National Bank of Poland and the establishment of the state bank took place pursuant to Articles 63 and 95 of the Banking Law of 26 February 1982 and the Regulation of the Council of Ministers of 7 September 1987.

=== Third Republic of Poland ===
Pursuant to the Regulation of the Council of Ministers of 18 January 2000, the bank was transformed on 12 April 2000 into a sole-shareholder company wholly owned by the State Treasury under its current name. On 10 November 2004, the bank made its debut on the Warsaw Stock Exchange.

In 2019, they were announced the title sponsor for the Polish Ekstraklasa.

On 2 February 2024 the bank dismissed eight out of eleven members of the supervisory board. 5 days later, on 7 February 2024, the President of the Management Board of the bank Darius Szwed resigned, leaving the bank the following week. On 15 February 2024, Szymon Midera was appointed acting President of the Management Board. On 26 March 2024 he was appointed President of the Management Board, subject to approval by the Polish Financial Supervision Authority (KNF), which was granted on 14 June 2024.

== Operations ==
PKO Bank Polski is a universal bank serving individuals, small and medium-sized enterprises, and large corporations. According to its 2025 annual report, the bank operated 947 retail branches, 24 corporate centres grouped into six macroregions, 8 private banking offices, 3,117 ATMs and 225 agencies, and served approximately 12.5 million customers.

The bank also operates abroad through subsidiaries in Ukraine, Sweden and Ireland, and through branches in Germany, the Czech Republic, Slovakia and Romania.

In 2023, the bank's total assets surpassed half a trillion Polish złoty for the first time in its history.

=== Awards ===
PKO Bank Polski has received industry distinctions and awards from Polish financial-sector institutions.

- "Bank of the Year in Poland" awarded by The Banker magazine (Financial Times Group) — received seven times, in 2007, 2011, 2014, 2016, 2019, 2020 and 2022.
- Company of the Year 2018 of the Economic Forum.
- "Leader in De Minimis Guarantee Sales" award from BGK (2020).
- "Mediation-Friendly Financial Institution" distinction from the KNF (2021, 2023, 2024), for its settlement programme for Swiss franc mortgage borrowers.
- Award from the KDPW (ex aequo with ING Bank Śląski) for active participation in the development of the interest-rate market and the clearing of OTC derivatives and repo transactions, presented at the gala marking KDPW's 30th anniversary (2024).
- Three regional distinctions in Global Finance competitions for Central and Eastern Europe (2026): "Best Investment Bank" and "Regional Sector Winner – Power/Energy" in the World's Best Investment Banks Awards 2026, and "Best Platform/Technology Facilitating Sustainability Finance" in the Sustainable Finance Awards 2026.

The bank's team of economists won the macroeconomic-forecasting competition of the daily Parkiet four times in five years — in 2020, 2021, 2023 and 2024 (in 2022 the team finished sixth).

Historically, the bank has also been recognised among the most valuable Polish brands. The Banker valued its brand at US$1 billion in 2010, and in the 2011 Brand Finance Banking 500 ranking the brand was valued at US$1.480 billion, placing it first in Poland and Central and Eastern Europe, and 114th worldwide.

== Ownership ==
PKO Bank Polski is controlled by the State Treasury, its largest shareholder, which held 29.43% of shares as of May 2026. Other shareholders include Nationale-Nederlanden Open Pension Fund (formerly ING OFE) with 7.32% of the share capital and Allianz Polska Open Pension Fund with 6.00%, with the remaining 57.25% held by other shareholders.

== Financial data ==
Year	Net profit (Note: Net profit attributable to the parent company.) (in billion PLN)	Assets (Note: Total assets.) (in billion PLN)
2025	10.682	583.1
2024	9.304	525.2
2023	5.502	501.5
2022	3.333	430.7
2021	4.874	418.1
2020	-2.557	377
2019	4.031	348
2018	3.741	324.3
2017	3.104	296.9
2016	2.874	285.6
2015	2.610	266.9
2014	3.254	248.7
2013	3.230	199.2
2012	3.749	193.5
2011	3.807	190.7
2010	3.217	169.7
2009	2.305	156.5
2008	3.121	134.6
2007	2.904	108.6
2006	2.149	101.3
2005	1.676	91.6
2004	1.508	85.9
2003	1.193	84.6
2002	1.051	82.2
2001	0.887	79.3

== Capital Group ==
PKO Bank Polski is the leader of the Capital Group. In addition to the parent company, the group comprises subsidiaries, jointly controlled entities and associates, operating primarily in the financial market and complementing the bank's offer with services such as leasing, electronic card transaction settlement, factoring, and investment (TFI) and pension (OFE) fund management. The group is also active in the real estate market.

Direct subsidiaries of PKO Bank Polski:

- PKO Bank Hipoteczny SA (mortgage banking, Warsaw)
- PKO Towarzystwo Funduszy Inwestycyjnych SA (investment fund management, Warsaw)
- PKO BP Bankowy Powszechne Towarzystwo Emerytalne SA (pension fund management, Warsaw)
- PKO Leasing SA (leasing and lending, Warsaw), whose group includes among others:
  - PKO Masterlease SA (formerly Prime Car Management SA, renamed 27 February 2026; Gdańsk)
  - PKO Faktoring SA (Warsaw)
  - PKO Leasing Sverige AB (Stockholm, Sweden)
- PKO BP Finat sp. z o.o. (services, including transfer agent services and IT specialist outsourcing, Warsaw)
- PKO Życie Towarzystwo Ubezpieczeń SA (life insurance, Warsaw)
- PKO Towarzystwo Ubezpieczeń SA (other personal and property insurance, Warsaw)
- PKO Finance AB (financial services, Sollentuna, Sweden)
- Kredobank SA (banking, Lviv, Ukraine)
- Neptun – FIZAN (closed-end investment fund, Warsaw) (Note: PKO Bank Polski holds the fund's investment certificates; the stated share refers to the proportion of investment certificates held.)
- PKO VC – FIZAN (closed-end investment fund, Warsaw)

As of March 2026, PKO Bank Polski also holds interests in joint ventures and associates, including a 50% stake in Operator Chmury Krajowej sp. z o.o., 34% in eService, 25.0001% in Bank Pocztowy SA, and 21.11% in System Ochrony Banków Komercyjnych SA.

Companies formerly part of the group include:

- Merkury – FIZAN, merged into the Neptun fund in January 2024

== Management Board ==
As of May 2026, the Management Board comprises:

- Szymon Midera – President of the Management Board
- Krzysztof Dresler – Vice President of the Management Board in charge of the Finance and Accounting Area and International Banking Area
- Ludmiła Falak-Cyniak – Vice President of the Management Board in charge of the Corporate and Investment Banking Area
- Piotr Mazur – Vice President of the Management Board of the Bank in charge of the Risk Management Area
- Tomasz Pol – Vice President of the Management Board in charge of the Retail and Business Banking Area
- Michał Sobolewski – Vice President of the Management Board in charge of the Administration Area and the Operations Area
- Mariusz Zarzycki – Vice President of the Management Board in charge of IT Area

== Presidents ==
- since 15.02.2024 Szymon Midera
- 13.04.2023 – 14.02.2024 Dariusz Szwed
- 10.08.2022 – 12.04.2023 Paweł Gruza
- 23.10.2021 – 09.08.2022 Iwona Duda
- 08.06.2021 – 22.10.2021 Jan Emeryk Rościszewski
- 01.10.2009 – 07.06.2021 Zbigniew Jagiełło
- 20.05.2008 – 07.07.2009 Jerzy Pruski
- 11.04.2007 – 20.05.2008 Rafał Juszczak
- 10.01.2007 – 11.04.2007 Marek Głuchowski
- 29.09.2006 – 10.01.2007 Sławomir Skrzypek
- 20.06.2002 – 29.09.2006 Andrzej Podsiadło
- 12.04.2000 – 20.06.2002 Henryka Pieronkiewicz
- 14.04.1994 – 08.12.1999 Andrzej Topiński
- 17.05.1991 – 07.02.1994 Stanisław Pietrasiewicz
- 12.04.1988 – 17.05.1991 Marian Krzak
- 01.08.1955 – 30.06.1975 Edward Walaszczyk
- 1953 – 31.07.1955 Czesław Liżewski
- 1952 – 01.07.1953 Jan Marceli Drohojowski
- 1950 – 1952 Józef Gitler-Barski

== See also ==
- Economy of Poland
- Warsaw Stock Exchange
- WIG30
- List of banks in Poland
