= Swiss franc loans =

Foreign currency loans in Swiss francs and related legal disputes in Europe

Swiss franc loans are foreign currency loans denominated in Swiss francs (CHF) and granted to borrowers who typically earn income in another currency, such as the euro or the Polish złoty. These loans became widespread across Europe—especially in Central and Eastern Europe—during the early 2000s due to the low interest rates associated with the Swiss franc. However, subsequent appreciation of the franc significantly increased the repayment burdens for borrowers, triggering widespread litigation, consumer protection concerns, and intervention by the European Court of Justice (ECJ).

== Background ==
Swiss franc loans were commonly marketed across the EU as a cheaper alternative to local currency loans, particularly in countries with high domestic interest rates. In many cases, banks offered these products to consumers without adequate disclosure of the exchange rate risks involved. The popularity of such loans increased particularly in the run-up to the 2008 global financial crisis, at a time when the Swiss National Bank maintained a relatively stable franc-to-euro exchange rate.

When the Swiss franc began appreciating—most notably following the removal of the CHF/EUR floor in 2015—the monthly repayments and outstanding capital amounts on these loans increased dramatically. This led to legal challenges across multiple EU member states, with courts often evaluating whether the original loan contracts respected EU consumer protection standards.

== Legal and regulatory issues ==
The primary legal controversy surrounding Swiss franc loans relates to the use of unfair terms in loan contracts, in particular:

- Lack of transparency regarding exchange rate risks,
- Unilateral bank discretion in determining conversion rates or charging fees,
- Complex indexing mechanisms not understood by average consumers.

Under the Unfair Terms in Consumer Contracts Directive (93/13/EEC) of 1993, such provisions must be drafted in plain, intelligible language and must not create a significant imbalance in the rights and obligations of the parties to the detriment of the consumer. The ECJ has ruled on several occasions that failure to adequately inform consumers of the financial risks associated with foreign-currency denominated loans constitutes an unfair term, potentially leading to annulment of the contract.

== European Court of Justice case law ==
The ECJ has issued multiple judgments on Swiss franc loans since 2014, interpreting the Unfair Terms Directive. Key rulings include:

- Kásler v. OTP Jelzálogbank (C-26/13): Established that a court can assess whether an exchange rate clause is unfair even if it concerns the main subject of the contract, provided it is not expressed in plain and intelligible language.
- Andriciuc v. Banca Românească (C-186/16): Clarified that informing consumers of general currency fluctuation risk is insufficient; lenders must also disclose specific impacts on repayments.
- Dziubak v. Raiffeisen Bank (C-260/18): Found that national courts may annul the entire loan contract if an unfair term cannot be replaced by a supplementary provision under national law.

These rulings have had significant repercussions for litigation in national courts, guiding judges on how to assess the transparency and legality of indexed foreign currency clauses.

== Impact by country ==
Swiss franc loans were most prevalent in the following EU countries:

=== Poland ===
At their peak, CHF loans constituted nearly 70% of all mortgages issued in 2008. Legal uncertainty persists despite ECJ rulings, with over 190,000 ongoing court cases and various voluntary settlement schemes under negotiation.

=== Hungary ===
The government mandated full conversion of CHF loans into forint in 2015, just before the Swiss currency appreciated sharply. This proactive approach shielded households from currency shocks and has been praised for its timing.

=== Greece ===
Over 50,000 CHF mortgage holders were affected by the franc’s rise. In 2025, the government proposed a voluntary conversion scheme offering discounts on the exchange rate based on borrower income.

=== France (Swiss border regions) ===
French courts have annulled Swiss franc loans taken by cross-border workers who were insufficiently informed about exchange rate risks. These rulings enabled borrowers to recover losses due to exchange fluctuations.

=== Other countries ===
Swiss franc loans were also issued in Croatia, Romania, Austria, and Slovenia, with varying levels of borrower redress and national regulatory intervention.

== See also ==
- Foreign exchange risk
- Foreign currency mortgage
