= Bank Pocztowy =

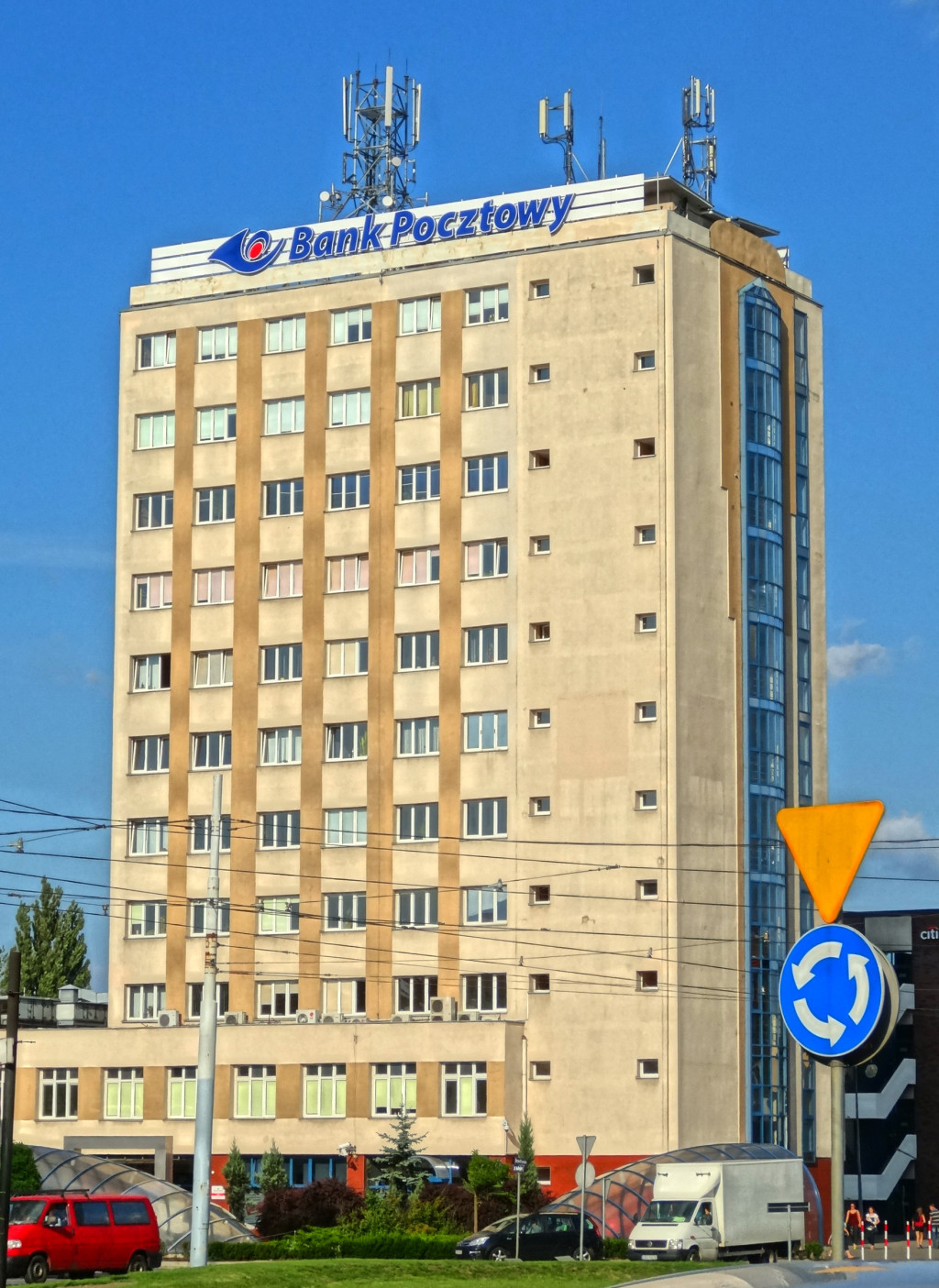
- Bank Pocztowy HQ in Bydgoszcz
- Native name: Bank Pocztowy S.A.
- Industry: Financial services
- Founded: 1990; 36 years ago
- Headquarters: ul. Jagiellońska 17, 85-959 Bydgoszcz, Poland
- Key people: Jakub Słupiński
- Number of employees: 1100
- Website: www.pocztowy.pl

Bank Pocztowy SA (English: Postal Bank SA) is a commercial bank in Poland, offering financial services for individual customers with a complementary offering for micro and small enterprises using its network and facilities of the Polish Post. Shareholders of the bank are: Polish Post SA (75% minus 10 shares) and PKO BP (25% plus 10 shares).

== History ==
In 1990 the bank was founded in Bydgoszcz. The idea behind its creation was to reactivate the traditional banking post in Poland. PKO became a shareholder in the bank in 2004.

The number of current accounts for individual clients in the second quarter of 2016 amounted to approx. 863 thousand pieces. This gives the bank the 11th place in Poland.

In July 2017, it launched its Internet brand EnveloBank, which in 2021 was used to migrate customers to the new mobile and internet banking system.

As of 2024, Bank Pocztowy had the largest number of customer service locations in Poland trough its partnership with the Polish Post.

=== Mobile banking ===
In March 2021, Bank Pocztowy withdrew the 2017 launched EnveloBank brand. Accounts, payment cards, internet banking and mobile banking services previously offered under the brand were transferred to the Pocztowy24 brand. In December 2021, the bank introduced a biometric Mastercard, which enables verification by fingerprint, for institutional customers.

== Branch network ==
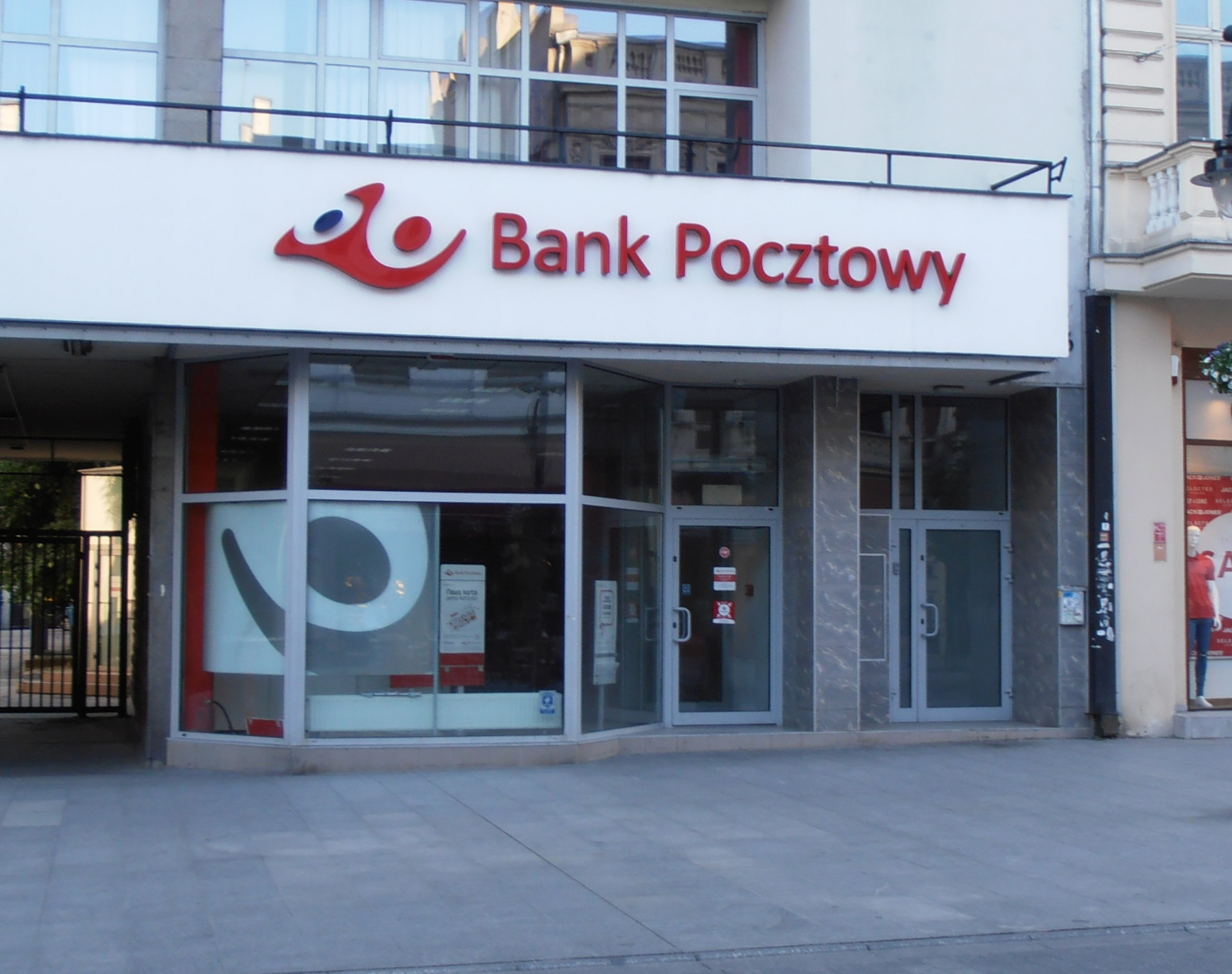
Postal Bank in Łódź with updated logo

Bank Pocztowy offers its services throughout Poland. At the end of 2024, the banks customer service network comprised more than 4,800 locations, of which 131 were Bank Pocztowy's own branches and the rest were Polish Post branches. These provided access to basic banking services, such as cash deposits and withdrawals, transfers, and deposit accounts.

== See also ==
- List of banks in Poland
