= Pay to fly =

Aviation industry practice

Pay-to-fly is an aviation industry practice whereby professional pilots assume duty while paying for it. The practice extends to airline training in the form of type ratings with or without employment guarantee, that some pilots pay to increase their marketability. Even though studied, the subject matter is prevented under no regulation.

== Description ==
The pay-to-work program— mostly referred to as "pay-to-fly" or "p2f", also known as "self-sponsored line training"—is an aviation industry practice whereby a professional pilot operates an aircraft on revenue-earning commercial operation by paying for it. Prices range from around 14,000 euros to sometimes over 85,000 euros for a "flight hour package" of generally 500 hours on an airliner; no salaries involved. When remuneration is offered, substantial loans to third parties (brokers) are enforced, which outweigh pilots' financial gain.

Typical customers include, but are not limited to, "low timers" (inexperienced pilots) and low-hour type rated pilots (e.g., B737 type rated or qualified, A320 type rated, etc.) that pay to work to build hours and improve their odds at finding an employment as airline pilots, thus challenging the "pilot shortage" mainstream consensus. The practice extends to airline-dedicated pilot training, in the form of type ratings available for a check, no employment guarantee at stakes, where pilots further shift from investment-worth company assets to source of revenue.

== Origin ==
On 2 November 1924, Harold Pitcairn founded the Pitcairn Flying School and Passenger Service. Rebranded Eastern Air Lines in 1926, it flourished for decades after the 1950s until acquired by Franz Lorenzo in 1985 amidst indebtment and labour dispute in the new Airline Deregulation Act market. Management decisions (e.g., asset transfer to Continental Airlines) combined with further labour unrest against IAM, TWA and ALPA during the 1989 Easter Airline strike led to the company liquidation in 1991.

In 1988, Thomas L. Cooper, one of its former Boeing 727 captain who flew during the 1989 strike, launched a small charter company named Gulfstream International Airlines (GIA) offering flights around South Florida, the Bahamas and Cuba in Cessna 402s. Early on, Captain candidates paid $15,000 up front starting in 1992 ($34,414 in 2025) with intermediary business Avtar International doing the recruiting and advertising, selling multi-engine time in Cessna 402s with the assurance from the Miami Flight Standard District Office that this time was loggable. At the time, captains received compensation only following successful completion of Initial Operating Experience (IOE), First Officers would continue to fly without pay for between 150–200 hours. They were often able to continue flying without purchasing additional hours if replacements didn't come in quickly enough.

== Regulation ==
=== FAA ===
The Colgan Air Flight 3407 crash led to the Federal Aviation Administration (FAA) passing new pilot qualification standards. These standards also addressed a mandate passed by the U.S. Congress when they enacted H.R. 5900 (111th), the Airline Safety and FAA Extension Act of 2010. This act also foresaw the modification of "requirements for the issuance of an airline transport pilot certificate" in ways that were implemented by FAA's regulation & policy n°8900.225 titled Pilot Certification and Qualification Requirements for Air Carrier Operations on July 10, 2013

Aforementioned regulation reduced the scope of pay-to-fly among FAA licensees by raising minimum standards. Indeed, to serve as SIC (Second In Command or First Officer):

"A pilot may be eligible if he or she was a military-trained pilot; a graduate of a four-year bachelor degree program with an aviation major; a graduate of a two-year associate degree program with an aviation major; or has 1,500 hours total time as a pilot".

No FAA regulations explicitly ban pay-to-fly.

=== EASA ===
"The fact that airlines make their personnel pay does not intervene in aviation safety regulation, as long as pilots are technically qualified" _Dominique Fouda, Head of EASA's Communication Department

In Europe, among EASA licence holders, pay-to-fly is a practice acknowledged to exist, though, "neither the European Commission, nor the EASA cared":

"The fact that airlines make their personnel pay does not intervene in aviation safety regulation, as long as pilots are technically qualified", said Dominique Fouda, EASA Head of Communication & Quality Department.

Several studies changed this position however.

=== Switzerland ===
According to FOCA vice director Marcel Zuckschwerdt:

"There is no regulation that would prohibit from doing this [pay-to-fly], it is absolutely possible. One can wonder of course, is it safe? Is it acceptable in terms of safety? And when we examined the matter, we reached the conclusion that, in the end, it's the pilot motivation that is the argument to say it is satisfying in terms of safety" (at 9':50")

==== France ====
Pay-to-fly is illegal per social regulation as a work contract can be established on demand by a judge as long as:

1. there's a proven subordination relationship between the service provider and the party benefiting from said service;
2. the moral or physical person benefiting from the service enforces a framework to which the service provider abides.

Legal action can be taken in case of violation, and sanctions can amount from 45,000 to 220,000 euros in fines and 3 years of prison. According to the French DGAC, "pay-to-fly is not used among carriers operated under the French flag" which doesn't prevent French pilots from suffering from it.

===== France statistics =====
In 2013, 1,739 French pilots were registed in Pôle emploi, a 43% rise as per the three preceding years. In December 2014, graduate student pilots from the ENAC (French Civil Aviation University) alone, reported under the AGEPAC association that, from 2006 to 2011 concerning a sample of 319 pilots:

- 15% were voluntary workers/without activity/registered in Pôle emploi
- 42% didn't have an activity allowing them to fly
- 44% deemed their activity wasn't in accordance with their training
- Salaried employment rate (all employment fields) went gradually from 94% for 2006 trainees to 15% for 2011 ones.

As a result, of the pilots not flying as their main activity:

- 86% were willing to move abroad
- 82% were willing to pay a type rating

==== Norway ====
The Civil Aviation Authority, responsible for aviation safety in Norway, is not concerned.

According to Frode Lenning, head of Fleet Operation Section, CAA: “Pilots have been trained within commercial companies for years. However, it is new that some companies ask money to train pilots within their own company [...] We have been training cadet pilots in the cockpit for years, at different levels. What is new here, is the social aspect, and this is not part of the aviation safety regulatory system” ".

However, during the pilots' strike of Norwegian in March 2015, pay-to-fly airline Small Planet Airlines performed 50 NAS slots under wet lease, establishing a workforce that pay to work while at the same time breaking their colleagues' strike.

==== Netherlands ====
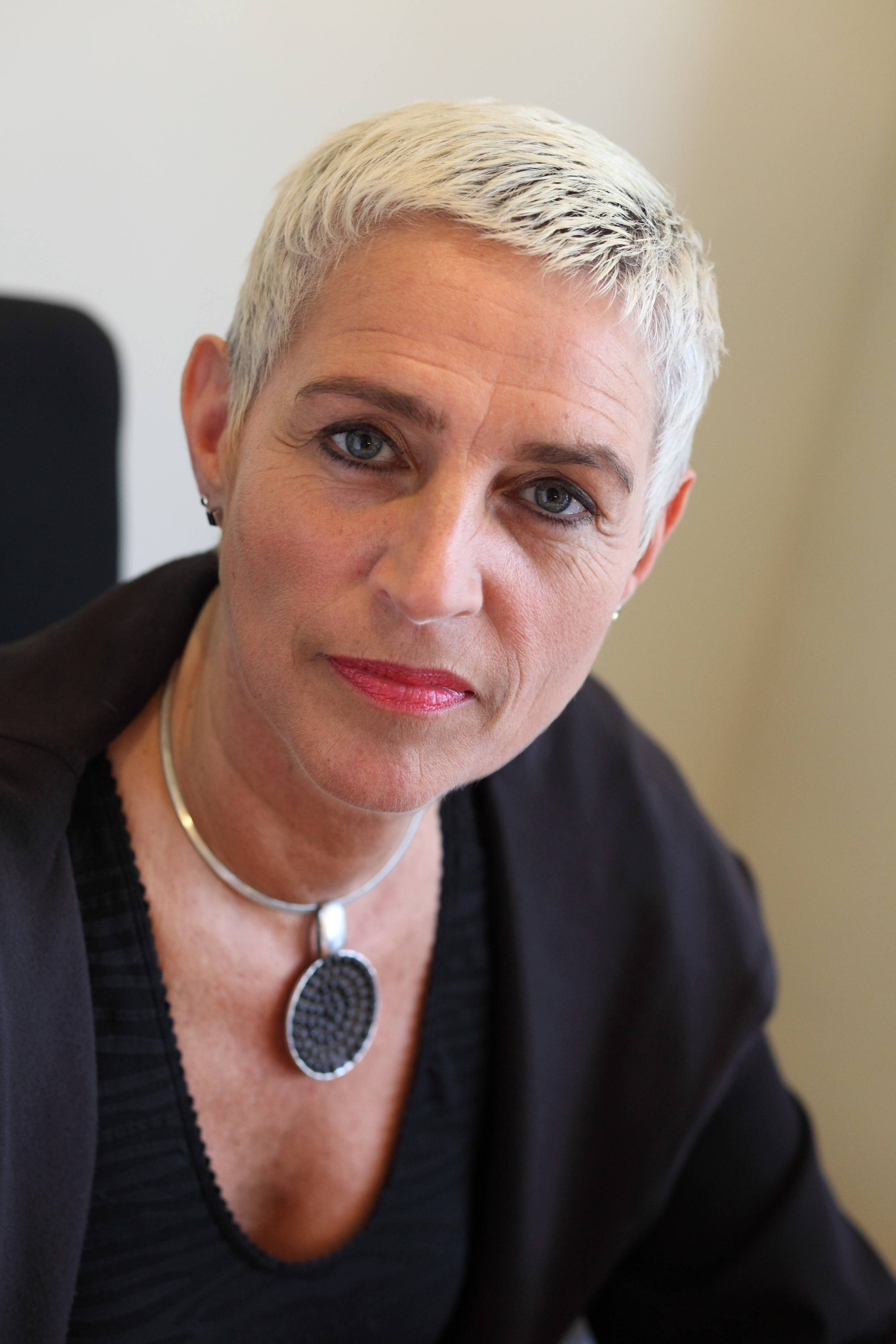
"Given the fact that EASA tackles this issue appropriately and also given the fact that the Dutch aviation sector to the extent known is currently not using these contracts on a large scale, from a safety point of view there is as yet no reason to intervene at a national level." Wilma Mansveld

Since 2008 the job market for pilots has deteriorated rapidly. Most pilots that have been trained at a Dutch flight school have to look for a job abroad. According to VNV-DALPA the job market for ab initio pilots is poor. "Some companies outside the Netherlands do hire pilots, but these are so-called pay to fly-schemes. This means pilots have to invest a lot of money for a badly paid job and a temporary contract".

On May 22, 2015, Member of Dutch Parliament Martijn van Helvert issued a first round of four questions to the House of Representatives of the States General on 'pay to fly', answered on June 2, 2015, by former State Secretary for the Ministry of Infrastructure and the Environment Wilma Mansveld.

A second round of seven questions and answers followed on June 22, 2015.

===== Netherlands statistics =====
In February 2015 the Dutch Airline Pilots Association (VNV - Dutch ALPA) reported 1,200 Dutch pilots out of 4,100 worldwide (almost 30%) were unemployed. The unemployment rate remains high.

==== Germany ====
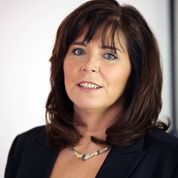
"Given these strongly undesirable developments in the aviation industry [p2f], I would like to see a determined action by the EU Commission. An end to the exploitation of young pilots must now be set." _Jutta Steinruck

On May 5, 2015, Member of European Parliament Jutta Steinruck issued a set of three written questions to the European Commission under the subject "Exploitative employment models at low-cost airlines (‘Pay to Fly’)":

1. Is the Commission aware that European airlines operate Pay to Fly schemes?
2. Does the Commission agree that this employment model may undermine aviation safety?
3. Does the Commission intend to take action against airlines which operate these exploitative schemes, and will it investigate training systems in the aviation sector?

On behalf of the Commission, on July 10th 2015, Violeta Bulc respectively answered:

1. The Commission has been informed recently by pilots' organisations about pay-to-fly schemes used by certain European airlines. The Commission services are currently investigating this specific matter.
2. The Commission has so far not received clear evidence as to the impact of this employment model on safety.
3. Based on the information and data collected, the nature and extent of the phenomenon will be assessed and the need for targeted action discussed at the appropriate level.

The questions were formulated 2 days before the May 7th 2015 EP "Committee on Employment and Social Affairs" meeting in Brussels that MEP Steinruck also attended where pay-to-fly was discussed.

===== Germany statistics =====
From a 2013 Der Spiegel article, "According to calculations by [VC spokesman Handwerg]'s union, there are already more than 1,500 unemployed pilots in Germany, an upward trend".

==== United Kingdom ====
Following the ECA Conference of February 12-13th 2015 on "Atypical Employment" where one "Nextgen pilot [said] pay to fly is wrong but policy makers turning their backs [...]", BALPA launched the NexGen program on February 27 to "protect the Profession by reaching down to new entrants". Acknowledging "the most difficult part of pilots’ career is the beginning", Wendy Pursey, head of membership and career services at BALPA authored a booklet titled Becoming A Pilot: The Inside Track, warning :

- Some airlines require the pilot to pay for a type rating in full before commencing training, usually at a cost – about £18,000 to £35,000.
- It is possible to complete the type rating and line training without having employment. Some agencies and FTOs will charge you to put you through your type rating and place you with an airline to operate as a First Officer until completion of your line training. You would receive no salary during hours-building, so arguably you are paying the airline to work for them.
- The cost of this varies depending upon the company, and often does not usually come with any guaranteed job offer at the end of the line training or hours-building.
- The risk to consider here is that you are rating yourself on one particular aircraft, and therefore in the event that you do not continue with that airline, it makes you more attractive only to other airlines operating that type, and can be a waste of money if you land a job with the operator of a different type. This airline may then require you to fund another type rating which might be beyond you financially once you’ve funded the first rating.

"BALPA does not recommend funding type ratings unless absolutely necessary".

===== UK statistics =====
Questioned by The Guardian on October 24, 2015, Pursey assessed :

- there are currently 505 unemployed pilots on Balpa’s books.
- Cadets can graduate with repayment obligations of up to £1,500 a month, no guarantee of a job.
- Starting salaries as low as £29,000.

Of the 560 cadets in Balpa’s membership :

- for more than 50% of them, the cost of training would exceed £100,000.
- Only 12% had any kind of sponsorship;
- 45.2% had taken out a loan,
- 41.9% were being helped by their parents.

== Academic research and studies ==
=== French Senate report ===
On April 10, 2014, Senator Éric Bocquet released an Information Report on behalf of the European Affairs Commission on social dumping in European transport. In the aviation sector specifically (chapter II), subpart B (frauds), Senator Bocquet acknowledged "Strategic Airlines Luxembourg had, for all intents and purposes, set up a system of pay-to-fly, young pilots having to pay in order to fly and thus acquire flight hours".

=== Ghent University study ===
Co-financed by the European Commission and carried out across 11 countries by the Ghent University on behalf of the European Sectoral Social Dialogue Committee for Civil Aviation (notably the AEA, the ECA and the ETF), the study on "Atypical Employment in Aviation" was presented during the High-Level Atypical Employment conference in Paris on 12 and 13 February 2015.

Accounting for policy options, the study concluded:

"A mandatory internship for newly licensed cadets should be considered. Pilots fresh from school are in an extremely weak labour market position often only finding jobs at deplorable conditions or even having to resort to pay-to-fly schemes in order to clock up the flight experience required by airlines offering better conditions. [...] It is our strong opinion that pay-to-fly schemes should be prohibited, not only in the European Union, but globally".

=== Expert consultancy ===
- The European Commission (both DG MOVE and DG EMPL) met the ECA and Cockpitseeker on June 18 to collect their views and evidence.
- Partly in Response to MEP Jutta Steinruck's questions, Steer Davies Gleave delivered to DG MOVE its study on "employment and working conditions in air transport and airports" on October 2, 2015. It found that: "Pay-to-fly schemes are schemes that require pilots to contribute financially to an airline 'in order to be allowed to fly and thus gain requisite flight experience'. Junior pilots without significant amounts of flight (type rating) experience are particularly vulnerable to such practices, although it is not clear how prevalent this is, or precisely which airlines are offering these schemes. [...] Pay-to-fly is acknowledged in published literature (e.g. Atypical employment study, Ghent University) as an issue however stakeholders did not specifically comment in this area."

=== French National Assembly report ===
On June 28, 2016, deputy member of the Assemblée Nationale Gilles Savary presented an Information Report on behalf of the commission for European Affairs and focused on the european strategy for aviation issued by the European Commission on December 7, 2015. Paragraph II.C.1. asserts that Senator Bocquet's report "published little more than two years ago established an enlighting overview on social dumping associated with applicable right in the air transport, which remains fully relevant to this day". Subsequent II.C.1.a. titled "European Commission adopts a near laissez-faire attitude towards the labour aspect" states:

"Representative stakeholder organizations heard by the rapporteur brought an important nuance [...]: labour law in the [aviation] sector is not only poorly applied but also insufficient. Atypical employment forms (zero hours contracts, «pay-to-fly» scheme, fake self-employment and mailbox companies) aren't to blame on diverging rule interpretation but truly on their loopholes".

== Related incidents/accidents ==
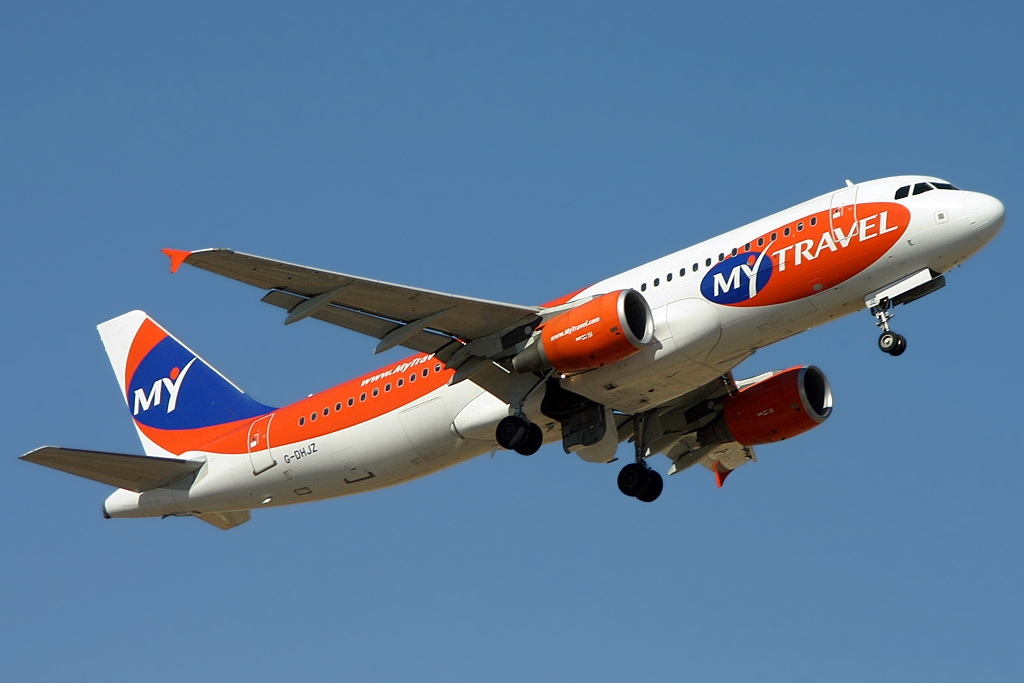
Airbus A320-214, MyTravel Airways

=== MyTravel Airways ===
On 5 July 2007, a First Officer who was not an employee but was paying MyTravel to gain flight experience on their aircraft (pay-to-fly), landed an Airbus A320 heavily at Kos airport in Greece causing substantial damage to the main landing gear. The report was critical of both the pilots training record and non-employees paying airlines to gain experience.

In February the same year, MyTravel Group plc agreed on a merger with Thomas Cook AG that became effective in June. As a result, the accident occurred under the common umbrella of Thomas Cook Group plc (as listed on the London Stock Exchange), with MyTravel Airways and Thomas Cook Airlines UK Ltd fusing into Thomas Cook Airlines on 30 March 2008.

== Controversy ==
=== Pros ===
Defending the 'pay-to-fly' model, a Cockpit4u spokeswoman stated: "It opens up career starters opportunities that are currently not offered on the European market. Abroad such training programs have been common for years".

Baltic Aviation Academy's view: When employed regularly, one "will most likely sign an agreement which indicates some sort of liabilities [...] and concessions for the company" that will "commit [oneself] to fly for a few years with that airline" with a "salary deduction from your monthly payment" in order to reimburse the airline's investment on the pilot whereas, one can "choose paid Line Training" to gain "independence" and avoid being "absolutely in [an airline's] service", to "gain the 'luxury' of choosing the airline which you would love to work for and ability to focus on the job which will bring you everyday pleasure"

"Independence" comes at 19,500 euros the type rating, to which a line training opportunity can be added that "can vary from 46,000 to 55,000 euros"

AviationCV reckons: "Line training price depends on the type of aircraft [...] line training A320 might cost around 40 000 – 50 000€ [...]. Usually cadets are asked to pay around 60% of payment before the program and rest of it after. It is important to mention that when obtaining for line training, pilots are not being paid." adding: "Despite the opinion that line training destroys the airline pilot industry (“Pay to fly”), line training is in itself necessary [...]. For sure, there was a time when airline pilot training was sponsored by the airline hiring a pilot. However, the situation has changed and only few airlines still apply this policy [...]. In order to start your pilot’s career, you need to invest."

=== Cons ===
Since the beginning of the recession “pay to fly” contracts have been introduced by some carriers. These contracts are designed to provide flexibility to the carrier and usually involve all the training costs being met by the applicant. Unfortunately at present, due to the economic situation and the surplus of pilots, this appears to be becoming an increasing trend and arguably results in individuals having limited loyalty and moving on to another airline which offers better careers, contracts/benefits/pay and long-term permanent employment at the earliest opportunity. In order to remain competitive many other carriers are seeing this as an attractive option resulting in potentially this type of contract being more common in the future. According to BALPA, "this is shortsighted and will ultimately deter some potentially good pilots from entering the industry", adding the Association is "concerned by the implications long-term".

The spreading of the practice is also linked to the rise of pilot generations "slowly strangled by their debt" where, pilot unions warn, "only the wealthiest, rather than the best, candidates will become pilots, because growing numbers of airlines are having their cadets pay to fly".

The ECA considers pay-to-fly as being "flexible contractual set-ups that are often at the edge of what is legal and what is necessary to guarantee flight safety".

"These set-ups force employees into temporary contract relationships, fake self-employment (e.g. requiring air crew to set up their own limited liability company that offers its services through agencies to the airline), and/or making use of fake work bases in non-European countries, and ‘pay to fly’ (P2F) programs (whereby newly graduated pilots have to pay their airline for gaining flying experience on an aircraft)"

Aside from a French senator report of information in the name of European commission affairs on social dumping in transports and a European petition supported by the ECA, as far as 'pay-to-fly' is concerned, no regulation and no legislation have been proposed so far.

== Airlines and brokers involved ==
When the information is available, brokers also aviation schools are prefixed: *

TRTOs (Type Rating Training Organisations) prefixed: **

| Operator or Broker (when applicable) | Airlines | Type Ratings | Line Training |
|---|---|---|---|
| (United States) (Czech Republic) (Taiwan) (Ghana) Aerorganizer Aviation Service International Co. LTD. also with **Aviation Training Center of Tunisia (ATCT) | Tunisair In general, pilot Recruitment & Training Service, Aircraft selling & Dry/Wet lease, A320 on type pilot training 500 hours with job assessment opportunity, A320 CBT courses selling | Yes | Yes |
| (Czech Republic) Aerojob | Travel Service a.s (under SmartWings) | Yes | No |
| (Unknown) | Aeronova | Yes | Yes |
| (Latvia) ***Air Baltic Training (subsidiary of Air Baltic) | Air Baltic | Yes | Yes |
| (Turkey) *Atlantic Flight Academy (AFA) | Atlasjet | Yes | Yes |
| (Netherlands) Aircrew Training Center (ATC) | Farnair (and subsidiary Farnair Training), Enter Air, Carpatair | Yes | Yes |
| (Lithuania) airhub flight school | Getjet | No | Yes |
| **Aviation Training Center of Tunisia (ATCT) in partnership with *G Air Training Center (Tunisair) | Nouvelair, Tunisair | Yes | Yes (1) |
| (Vietnam) Atrans Aviation | VietjetAir | No | Yes |
| (Lithuania) AviationCV | Small Planet Airlines | No | Yes |
| (Lithuania) ***Baltic Aviation Academy | Atlasjet, Estonian Air, Royal Air Maroc, VietjetAir | Yes (Estonian Air) | Yes (not Estonian Air) |
| (Unknown) | (Romania) Blue Air BMS srl | Yes | Yes |
| (Unknown) | Blue Panorama Airlines | No | No |
| (Republic of Ireland) CAE Parc Aviation and (United Kingdom) Brookfield Aviation International | Ryanair, EasyJet | Yes (2) | Yes |
| (Germany) **Cockpit4U | Germania | Yes | Yes (3) |
| (Unknown) | Croatia Airlines | No | Yes |
| (United Arab Emirates) Desert Rose Aviation | (Unknown) | Yes | Yes |
| (Republic of Ireland) Direct Personnel | (Unknown) | No | No |
| (United States) Eagle Jet | (Hungary) BH Air | No | Yes |
| (United States) Eagle Jet | (Lithuania) Lion Air, (Estonia) Nordica through subsidiary Regional Jet OÜ | Yes | Yes |
| (Spain) Elite Sky Aviation | (Unknown) | No | Yes |
| (Hong Kong) ETOPS Flight | Royal Air Maroc Express | Yes (broker only ) | Yes |
| (Malaysia) Fly Gosh | (Unknown) | No | No |
| (Spain) *FTE Jerez | Volotea | Yes | Yes |
| (Unknown) | Galain Aviation | No | Yes |
| (United Kingdom) **IAGO flight training UK | Thomas Cook | Yes | Yes |
| (Switzerland) IXO Aviation Swiss | (Unknown) | Yes | Yes |
| (United Kingdom) **Jet Flight Training Ltd | (Unknown) | Yes | Yes |
| (Belgium) ***TUIfly Academy Brussels | Jetairfly | Yes | No |
| (India) / (Cyprus) Knots Aviation | (Unknown) | Yes | Yes |
| (Cyprus) Laffair Aviation via (France) Sim Aviation Group | Pegasus Airlines, AtlasGlobal, Turkish Airlines, SunExpress | Yes | Yes |
| (Sweden) **Lund University School of Aviation | Braathens Regional Airways, Norwegian, SAS | Yes | Yes |
| (Estonia) Nordic Crew Management (NCM) | NAG - Nordic Aviation Group (Nordica) | (Unknown) | Yes |
| (United Kingdom) Northern Flight Training UK | (Unknown) | Yes | Yes |
| (India) MSD Aviation Pvt. Ltd. | (Unknown) | Yes | Yes |
| (Unknown) | Pegasus Airlines | Yes | Yes |
| (Cyprus) Pilot Management Services | Small Planet Airlines | No | Yes |
| Planet Air Germany | (Unknown) | No | Yes |
| (New Zealand) Rishworth | Wings Air, Vietnam Airlines | No | Yes |
| (Emirate of Dubai) **Skies Aviation | (Unknown) | Yes | Yes |
| (Germany) Sky4u / Intex-Aero | (Unknown) | Yes | Yes |
| (Unknown) | Tarom | No | No |
| (Italy) TRTOagency | (Unknown) | Yes | No |
| (Tunisia) Type & Train | Nouvelair, Tunisair | Yes (broker only) | Yes |
| (Morocco) Type Line Training | (Unknown) | Yes | Yes |
| (Lithuania) **UAB Sabenavita | (Unknown) | Yes | Yes |
| (Vietnam) ATRANS AVIATION | Vietjet Air | No | Yes |
| (Unknown) | Wingjet Aviation | Yes | Yes |
| (United States) World Airline Services | Air Asia, Hainan Airlines, Air Gabon, Air Madagascar, Asiana Airlines, China Southern Airlines, Hong Kong Airlines, Royal Air Maroc, TAAG | No | No |

(1) "Note that [ATCT] work[s] very closely with Brookfield Aviations, the world leading pilot Brookers [sic] who will place you in an airline".

(2) This is "false accusations"_A spokesman for the Irish budget airline

(3) "Pay-to-fly at Germania? That is nonsense"_Karsten Balke, Chief Executive Officer of Germania
