= British Airline Pilots' Association =

British trade union

BALPA
- British Airline Pilots' Association
- Founded: 27 June 1937; 89 years ago
- Headquarters: West Drayton, England
- Location: United Kingdom
- Members: ▼14,282 (2024)
- General Secretary: Amy Leversedge
- Affiliations: TUC; STUC
- Website: www.balpa.org

The British Airline Pilots’ Association (BALPA) is the professional association and registered trade union for UK pilots. BALPA represents the views and interests of pilots, campaigning on contractual, legal and health issues affecting its members and the flying public.

== Membership and governance ==
BALPA represents 85% of all commercial pilots in the UK and represents over 10,000 members. These include helicopter winchmen and ground instructors. The association holds the largest collective resource of pilot qualification and experience in the UK.

BALPA is one of the founder members of the International Federation of Airline Pilots Associations (IFALPA), which co-ordinates the views and opinions of well over 100,000 flight crew around the globe. In Europe, BALPA is a founding member of ECA, the European Cockpit Association. BALPA also works with the Civil Aviation Authority, the Department for Transport, the Department of Trade and Industry and many other bodies where pilots have an interest in being represented.

BALPA is governed by an Annual Delegate Conference (ADC) made up of representatives of the Company Councils and a National Executive Committee (NEC) composed of elected pilots. As well as generating policy and association strategy, the NEC ensures that the organisation is run in an efficient, legal and responsible manner.

In December 2023 it was announced that a new General Secretary was appointed following an "extensive and exhaustive recruitment process" carried out by executive search firm CJPI, resulting in the first woman to be elected into the role in BALPA's history.

== Structure ==
BALPA has recognition agreements with airlines in multiple sectors. BALPA members in each of these companies elect a Company Council that leads a community of members.

There are eleven sub-committees of the NEC; Flight Safety and Security, Accident Analysis and Prevention, Air Traffic Services Study Group, Ops Aviation Medicine Group, Occupational Health and Safety Group, Aircraft Design & Operations/Aircraft Ground Environment, Security Group, Fatigue and Scheduling Group, Helicopter Affairs Committee, Remotely Piloted Aircraft Systems Work Group and Retired Flight Crew Committee.

== Membership ==
To qualify for Full Membership applicants must hold a current professional pilot licence or flight engineer licence issued by the UK or one of the JAA countries, be engaged in British commercial flying and be based in the UK or employed by a UK Company abroad. Alternatively members may qualify as a ground instructor or helicopter winchman employed in British commercial flying.

There are also membership categories available for overseas, retired, military, unemployed and trainee pilots.

== Industrial Activity ==
BALPA campaigns on a wide variety of issues which affect pilots and the flying public.

=== Air Passenger Duty ===
Air Passenger Duty (APD) is the UK Government tax that is charged on all passengers departing from a UK airport. BALPA is an active member of the A Fair Tax on Flying campaign, a coalition of more than 30 leading travel and aviation organisations including airlines, airports, trade associations and destinations who believe that APD is too high and is doing growing damage to jobs, growth and the UK economic recovery.

=== Casualisation ===
Casualisation and the use of contract labour is a growing issue in the aviation industry. BALPA has been campaigning on this issue and have had success in formulating a New Entrant Contract that delivers significant improvements to those entering the profession at EasyJet. Driving casualisation out of the whole industry remains one of BALPA's key priorities.

As part of its campaign to combat the growing use of contingent workers in the aviation industry, BALPA commissioned the Labour Research Department (LRD) in 2012 to work with the union to produce a booklet focusing on the use of contingent workers in airlines where BALPA is recognised. The booklet highlights the legal framework, in particular the Agency Workers Regulations, which became law in October 2011.

=== Flight Time Limitations ===
Flight Time Limitations exist to ensure the safe operation of commercial aircraft and to avoid the onset of pilot fatigue. Pilot fatigue is a state of serious tiredness and exhaustion that reduces a pilots ability to operate safely. 15-20% of fatal accidents related to human errors have listed pilot fatigue as a contributing factor. BALPA has continuously sought to protect high safety standards of Flight Time Limitations in the UK.

=== British Airways "Fire and Rehire" dispute ===
In summer of 2020, British Airways and its parent company International Airline Group announced a restructuring programme that included up to 12,000 redundancies, including 1,255 pilots. BALPA members eventually accepted a deal that included a temporary 20% pay cut and a reduced number (270) of compulsory redundancies.

== In popular culture ==
BALPA was featured in the Monty Python's Flying Circus television episode "Déjà Vu" in which Eric Idle portrays the BALPA spokesman in the 'Flying Lessons' sketch.

== See also ==
- List of trade unions
- Ryanair Pilot Group
