= Jutta Steinruck =

German independent politician (born 1962)

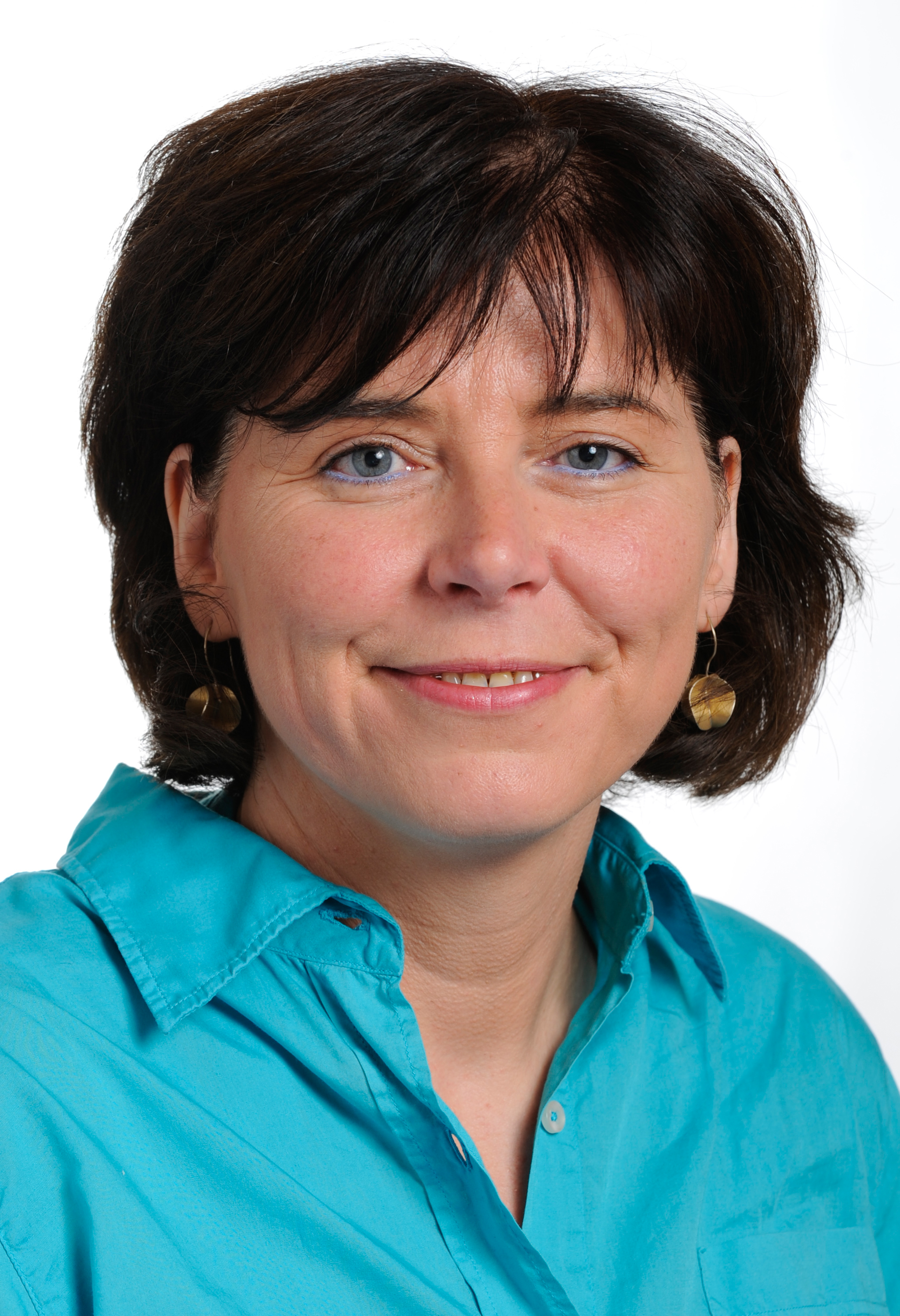

Lord Mayor of Ludwigshafen
- Incumbent
- Assumed office 1 January 2018
- Deputy: Cornelia Reifenberg
- Preceded by: Eva Lohse

Member of the European Parliament
- In office 14 July 2009 – 31 December 2017
- Constituency: Germany

Personal details
- Born: 1 September 1962 (age 63) Ludwigshafen, Rheinland-Pfalz, Germany
- Party: independent

Jutta Steinruck (born 1 September 1962) is a German independent politician. From 1996 to 2023 she was a member of the Social Democratic Party, part of the Party of European Socialists. From 2009 until 2017, she served as Member of the European Parliament (MEP) representing Germany. Since 2018 she serves as Lord Mayor of Ludwigshafen.

== Political career ==
=== Member of the European Parliament, 2009–2017 ===
During her time as Member of the European Parliament, Steinruck served on the following committees:

- Member, Committee on Employment and Social Affairs (2009–2017)
- Member, Delegation for relations with the Arab Peninsula (2009–2014)
- Member, Delegation to the EU-Albania Stabilisation and Association Parliamentary Committee (2014–2017)

In addition to her committee assignments, Steinruck served as a member of the European Parliament Intergroup on Western Sahara and as chairwoman of the European Parliament Intergroup on Trade Unions.

=== Mayor of Ludwigshafen, 2018–present ===
Steinruck has been serving as Mayor of Ludwigshafen since 2018.

In 2023, Steinruck left the SPD.

== Other activities ==
- Ludwigshafen Hospital, Ex-Officio Chairwoman of the Supervisory Board (since 2018)
- Technische Werke Ludwigshafen AG (TWL), Ex-Officio Chairwoman of the Supervisory Board (since 2018)
- German United Services Trade Union (ver.di), Member
