= Gulfstream International Airlines =

Airline of the United States

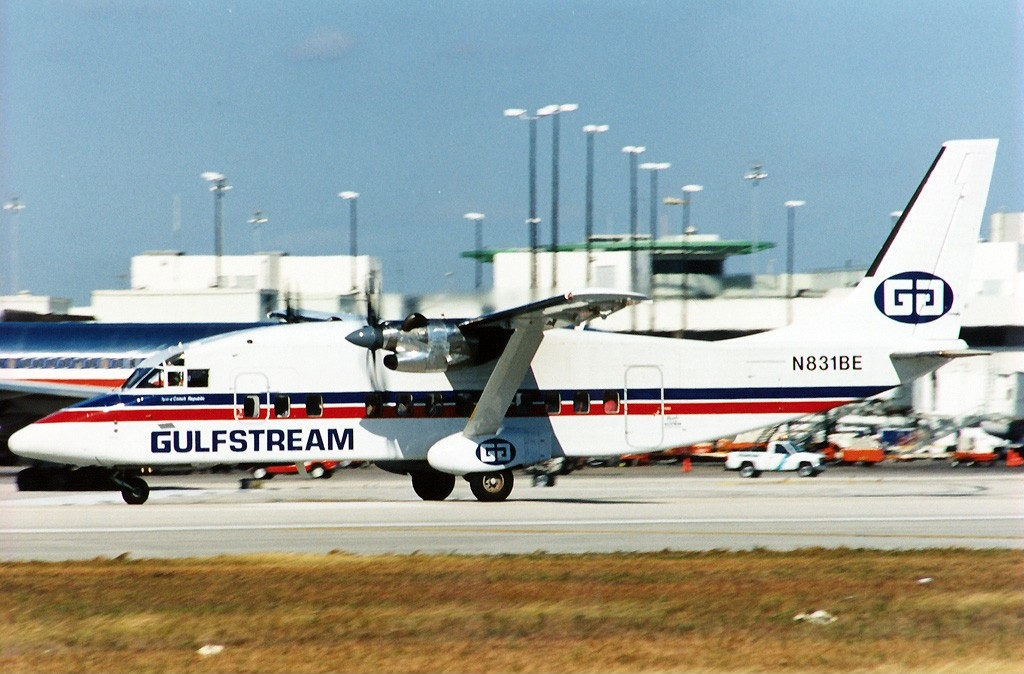
- Short 360 at Miami International
IATA	ICAO	Call sign
3M	GFT	GULF FLIGHT
- Founded: 1988; 38 years ago
- Commenced operations: December 1, 1990; 35 years ago
- Ceased operations: November 2010; 15 years ago
- AOC #: GUUA428B
- Fleet size: 24
- Destinations: 3
- Headquarters: Miami-Dade County, Florida; Dania Beach, Florida; Broward County, Florida
- Key people: Thomas L. Cooper

Gulfstream International Airlines was a United States airline that operated from 1988 to 2010. The airline primarily operated codeshare flights for major airlines. In December 2010, the airline went bankrupt and its assets were sold. Silver Airways launched as a new regional carrier with assets from Gulfstream.

== History ==
=== 1990s ===
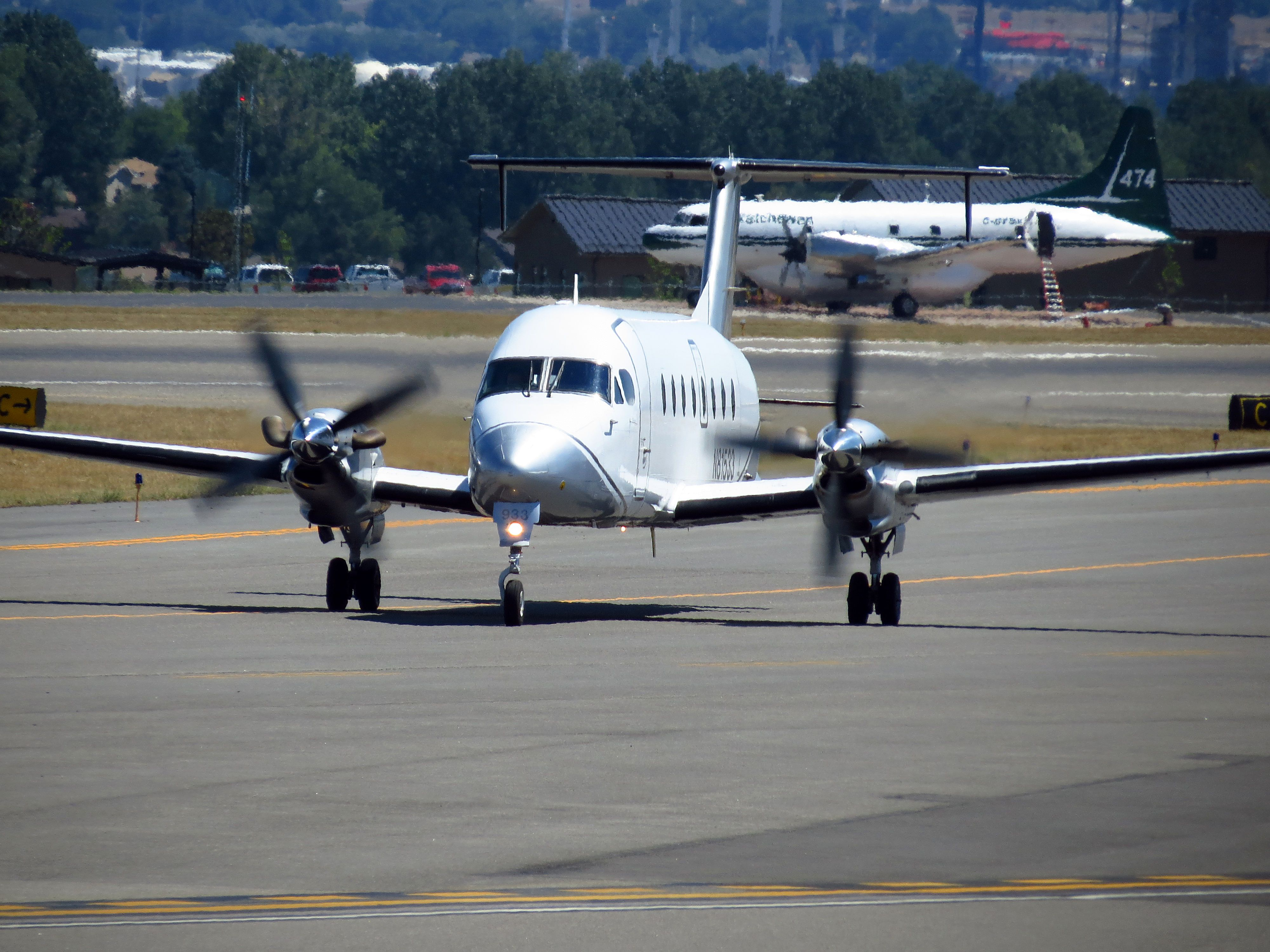
A Beechcraft 1900D airliner at Billings Logan International Airport.

The airline was established in October 1988 and started operations on December 1, 1990. Thomas L. Cooper, the founder, was a former Boeing 727 captain for Eastern Air Lines during the pilots' strike in 1989. Initially it operated as an on-demand air taxi between Miami, Florida and Cap-Haïtien, Haiti, but was relocated to the Bahamas when the political climate in Haiti forced the operation to halt. The airline also flew diplomatic mail to the U.S. Interest in Havana, Cuba on a weekly basis.

In May 1994, a codeshare agreement was signed with United Airlines. In December 1995, Gulfstream began the transition from a Part 135 carrier to a Part 121 carrier, allowing operation of larger aircraft such as leased Short 360 commuter turboprops. Gulfstream's parent company, G-Air Holdings, acquired Paradise Island Airlines in August 1998 and continued to operate its de Havilland Canada DHC-7 Dash 7s. Prior to Trans World Airlines' (TWA) acquisition by American Airlines, Gulfstream operated as a part of the Trans World Connection network as TWConnection.

Gulfstream International Airlines had a program in which first officers paid for their training in the Beech 1900 and flew as a line qualified first officer. To gain experience, pilots with low experience paid the airline to ride in the right seat in duty positions normally occupied by a paid professional; albeit one that receives very little pay. This was also the case with captains early on with candidates paying $15,000 up front starting in 1992 with Avtar International doing the recruiting and advertising. However, these pilots received compensation following successful completion of Initial Operating Experience (IOE). So called "Pay to work" programs started with Avtar International selling multi-engine time in Cessna 402s with the assurance from the Miami Flight Standard District Office that this time was loggable.

Avtar International was started by Vic Johnson of New Jersey and Bill Veiga, a former Cessna test pilot. Initially, most intern pilots were sent to Gulfstream's chief competitor, Airways International as Gulfstream possessed only one aircraft, a Cessna 402B. As Gulfstream continued to grow, they took a majority of the Avtar pilots. Soon, a turboprop program was added with the company's acquisition of 15 passenger Beechcraft C99 Airliners. Simultaneously, Avtar offered a heavy turboprop program with Airways International on their SD3-330. This program ended with the demise of Airways International and was only briefly restored with Gulfstream's own SD3-360s. While applicants have paid to be Captains and First Officers on all aircraft types operated by Gulfstream, the vast majority flew the airline's 19 passenger Beechcraft 1900. The programs for the CE-402, BE-C99, and Shorts 360 ended in 1995, 1996, and 1997, respectively.

Pilots who have interned with Gulfstream have been hired by many other airlines, including major airlines. While most became successful pilots, some were among the crews of prominent accidents, such as Pinnacle Airlines Flight 3701, Comair Flight 5191 and Colgan Air Flight 3407. Gulfstream itself has never had a fatal accident.

In July 1997, the airline's entire fleet of Shorts 360-300s were repossessed by the leasing company due, in part, to maintenance irregularities that included the welding of hydraulic lines. Gulfstream faced a civil penalty of US$1.3 million. Gulfstream's affiliate, Gulfstream Flight Academy, the successor to Avtar, came under scrutiny because Marvin Renslow, the pilot of Colgan Air Flight 3407, trained there.

=== 2000s ===
In August 2003, Paradise Island Airlines' operating certificate was sold to US Airways Group. In 2004, a long-term codeshare agreement with Continental Airlines was signed. In March 2006, Thomas L. Cooper sold his stake in the company to Gulfstream International Group, Inc., a newly formed corporation.

In 2009, U.S. Congress investigators and the Federal Aviation Administration (FAA) accused Gulfstream of falsifying flight time records, making crews fly longer hours than allowed by law, and providing below standard aircraft maintenance. The company's owner and chief pilot, Thomas L. Cooper, forbade the photocopying of aircraft logbooks done by some pilots to corroborate the times they logged in their personal logbooks.

Historically, pilots were paid "segment hours" which were based on en route (or takeoff-to-landing) times as opposed to block (or gate-to-gate) times and have been suspected of being part of an inducement for under reporting. Logging of true block hours could be detrimental to a pilot's pay. Whereas, most carriers pay pilots based on block time, since it is what FAA flight time limits are based on, Gulfstream did not. An incentive existed to under report block time by keeping it as close to en route time as possible thereby permitting pilots to get paid for the most en route hours in a given period. Delays that increased block times not only reduced the crewmember's utility to Gulfstream but also limited his pay. In 2009, Gulfstream International Airlines came under additional scrutiny due to three fatal crashes that all involved pilots that were trained at the Gulfstream Training Academy (its sister company), the last one in February 2009, where 50 died on Colgan Air Flight 3407 near Buffalo, NY.

In May 2009, the federal government issued a fine of $1.3 million against Gulfstream International Airlines after the Federal Aviation Administration found that it had falsified flight time records, allowing crews to fly longer hours than allowed by law, and providing below standard aircraft maintenance. In response, CEO Dave Hackett stated that "the airline does not have safety violations" and "the vast majority of findings were not violations at all".

=== 2010s ===
On November 4, 2010, Gulfstream International Airlines, Inc. filed for Chapter 11 bankruptcy protection. In May 2011 Victory Park Capital acquired Gulfstream International Airlines when it bought the assets of Gulfstream International Group. Victory Park also purchased 21 of Gulfstream’s Beechcraft 1900D aircraft from Raytheon Aircraft Credit Corporation. These assets were used to launch a new regional airline, Silver Airways, on December 15, 2011.

== Destinations ==
According to the winter/spring 1995 Gulfstream International route map, the airline was serving the following destinations in the southeast U.S. and the Bahamas:

Southeast U.S.

- Anniston, AL
- Atlanta, GA
- Daytona Beach, FL
- Fort Lauderdale, FL
- Gainesville, FL
- Key West, FL
- Marathon, FL
- Miami, FL - Hub
- Naples, FL
- Orlando, FL
- St. Petersburg, FL
- Tampa, FL
- West Palm Beach, FL

Bahamas

- Freeport
- Governor's Harbour
- Marsh Harbour
- Nassau
- North Eleuthera
- Treasure Cay

== Fleet ==
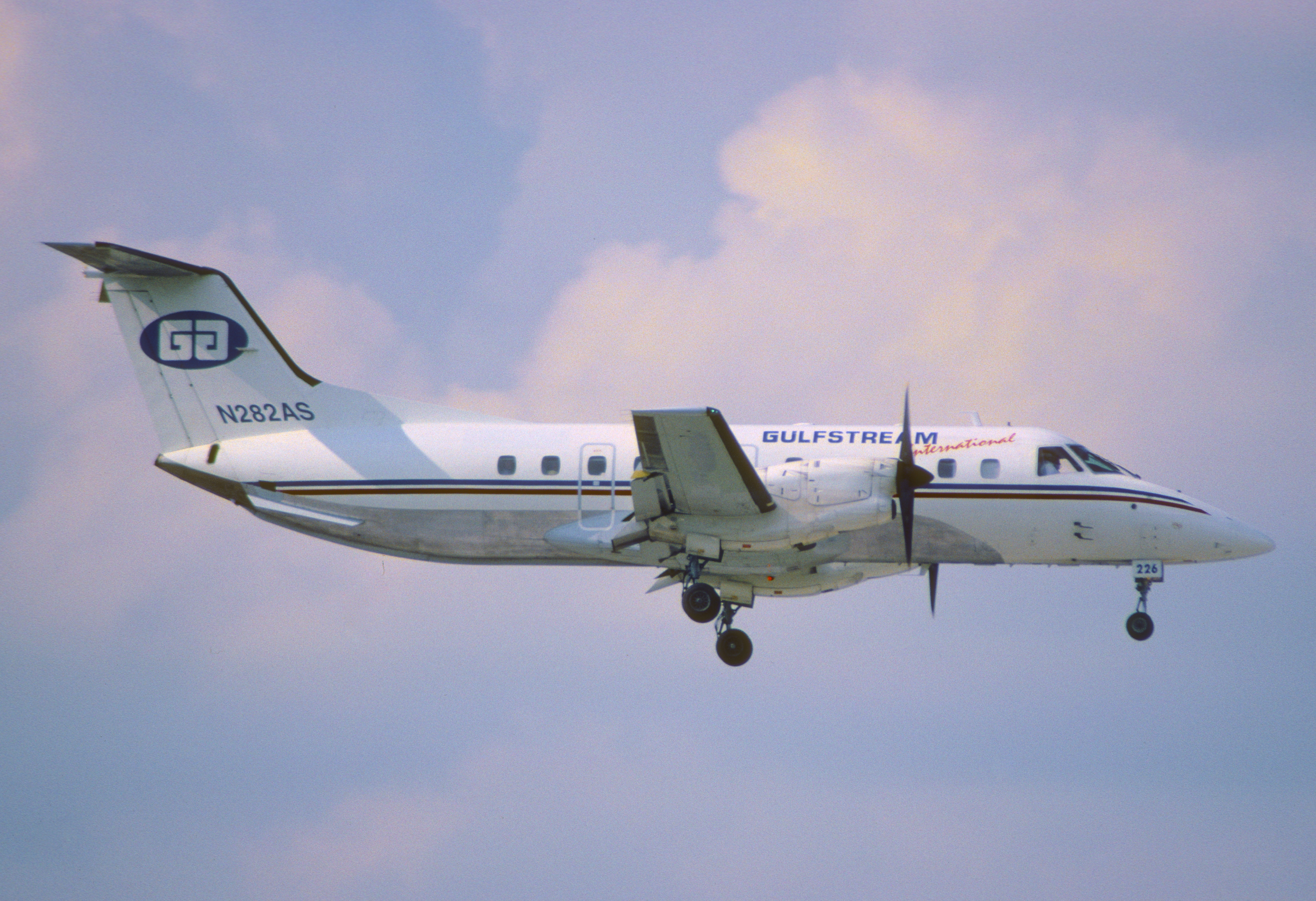
374cb - Gulfstream International Airlines Embraer 120ER

Gulfstream International operated the following commuter and regional turboprop airliners during its existence:

- Beechcraft C99
- Beechcraft 1900C
- Beechcraft 1900D
- Embraer EMB-120 Brasilia
- de Havilland Canada DHC-7 Dash 7
- Short 360

The airline also operated piston-powered Cessna 402 prop aircraft.

Many of Gulfstream International's Beechcraft 1900D aircraft as well as several Embraer EMB-120 Brasilia aircraft were painted in the livery of Continental Airlines when the airline was operating as a Continental Connection air carrier via a code sharing agreement with Continental.

== See also ==
- List of defunct airlines of the United States
