= Deutscher Städtetag =

Association of German Cities

The Deutscher Städtetag ('Association of German Cities') is an organization that represents interests of cities in Germany. The plans to establish the organization took place in Dresden in 1903. Its first meeting was held on November 27, 1905, in Berlin. It was dissolved in 1933, then re-formed in 1945. As of 2024 some 200 cities comprise its direct membership. The association's mission centers on sustaining the guarantee of local self-governance specified in the Grundgesetz für die Bundesrepublik Deutschland (German constitution), Article 28, paragraph 2.

== Member cities ==
Initially, each city with a population larger than 25,000 was eligible for membership in the organization.

Listed below are the approximately 200 member cities and towns of the Deutsche Städtetag, also referred to as Direct members (Unmittelbare Mitglieder) by the organization. In addition there are approximately another 3,000 cities and towns that are indirect members (Mittelbare Mitglieder). This means that they are not members of the Deutsche Städtetag itself, but are members of at least one of its Member associations (Mitgliedsverbände), such as the Städtetag Nordrhein-Westfalen or the Städte- und Gemeindebund Sachsen-Anhalt, for instance.

=== Baden-Württemberg ===
- Aalen
- Baden-Baden
- Biberach an der Riss
- Esslingen am Neckar
- Freiburg im Breisgau
- Friedrichshafen
- Heidelberg
- Heidenheim an der Brenz
- Heilbronn
- Karlsruhe
- Konstanz
- Ludwigsburg
- Lörrach
- Mannheim
- Offenburg
- Pforzheim
- Reutlingen
- Schwäbisch Gmünd
- Sindelfingen
- Stuttgart
- Tübingen
- Ulm
- Villingen-Schwenningen

=== Bavaria ===
- Amberg
- Ansbach
- Aschaffenburg
- Augsburg
- Bamberg
- Bayreuth
- Coburg
- Erlangen
- Fürth
- Gräfelfing
- Hof
- Ingolstadt
- Kaufbeuren
- Kempten
- Landsberg am Lech
- Landshut
- Lindau
- Memmingen
- Munich
- Neu-Ulm
- Neustadt bei Coburg
- Nuremberg
- Passau
- Regensburg
- Rosenheim
- Schwabach
- Schweinfurt
- Straubing
- Weiden in der Oberpfalz
- Würzburg

=== Brandenburg ===
- Bernau bei Berlin
- Brandenburg an der Havel
- Cottbus
- Eberswalde
- Erkner
- Falkensee
- Forst (Lausitz)
- Frankfurt (Oder)
- Hennigsdorf
- Neuenhagen bei Berlin
- Neuruppin
- Oranienburg
- Potsdam
- Schwedt
- Teltow
- Velten

=== Bremen ===
- Bremen
- Bremerhaven

=== Hesse ===
- Baunatal
- Darmstadt
- Frankfurt
- Fulda
- Giessen
- Hanau
- Kassel
- Marburg
- Offenbach am Main
- Wiesbaden

=== Lower Saxony ===
- Braunschweig
- Celle
- Delmenhorst
- Emden
- Goslar
- Göttingen
- Hamelin
- Hanover
- Hildesheim
- Lüneburg
- Neustadt am Rübenberge
- Oldenburg
- Osnabrück
- Salzgitter
- Wilhelmshaven
- Wolfsburg

=== Mecklenburg-Vorpommern ===
- Greifswald
- Neubrandenburg
- Rostock
- Sassnitz
- Schwerin
- Teterow
- Wismar
- Wolgast

=== North Rhine-Westphalia ===
- Aachen
- Bielefeld
- Bochum
- Bonn
- Bottrop
- Castrop-Rauxel
- Cologne
- Dortmund
- Duisburg
- Düren
- Düsseldorf
- Essen
- Gelsenkirchen
- Gladbeck
- Gütersloh
- Hagen
- Hamm
- Herford
- Herne
- Iserlohn
- Krefeld
- Leverkusen
- Mönchengladbach
- Mülheim
- Münster
- Neuss
- Oberhausen
- Recklinghausen
- Remscheid
- Siegen
- Solingen
- Viersen
- Witten
- Wuppertal

=== Rhineland-Palatinate ===
- Bad Kreuznach
- Frankenthal
- Kaiserslautern
- Koblenz
- Landau
- Ludwigshafen
- Mainz
- Neustadt an der Weinstraße
- Neuwied
- Pirmasens
- Speyer
- Trier
- Worms
- Zweibrücken

=== Saarland ===
- Saarbrücken

=== Saxony ===
- Annaberg-Buchholz
- Auerbach
- Bautzen
- Chemnitz
- Delitzsch
- Dresden
- Freiberg
- Glauchau
- Hoyerswerda
- Kamenz
- Leipzig
- Limbach-Oberfrohna
- Pirna
- Plauen
- Riesa
- Taucha
- Zwickau

=== Saxony-Anhalt ===
- Dessau-Roßlau
- Halle (Saale)
- Magdeburg
- Quedlinburg
- Stendal
- Wittenberg

=== Schleswig-Holstein ===
- Flensburg
- Kiel
- Lübeck
- Neumünster

=== Thuringia ===
- Eisenach
- Erfurt
- Gera
- Gotha
- Jena
- Mühlhausen
- Nordhausen
- Suhl
- Weimar

== Presidents ==
- 1948–1949: Louise Schroeder
- 1949–1953: Ernst Reuter
- 1954–1955, 1957–1958: Ernst Schwering
- 1955–1957: Otto Suhr
- 1958–1963: Willy Brandt
- 1963–1965: Arnulf Klett
- 1965–1967: Alfred Dregger
- 1967–1970: Willi Brundert
- 1970–1971: Hans-Jochen Vogel
- 1971–1977: Hans Koschnick
- 1977–1979, 1980, 1981-1983, 1989–1993: Manfred Rommel
- 1979–1980: Günther Bantzer
- 1983–1985: Günter Samtlebe
- 1985–1986: Walter Wallmann
- 1986, 1987–1989: Herbert Schmalstieg
- 1993–1995: Norbert Burger
- 1995–1997: Gerhard Seiler
- 1997–1999, 2002–2005, 2009–2011: Petra Roth
- 1999–2002: Hajo Hoffmann
- 2005–2009, 2011–2013: Christian Ude
- 2013–2015: Ulrich Maly
- 2015–2017: Eva Lohse
- 2018–2019: Markus Lewe
- 2019–2021: Burkhard Jung
- 2021–present: Markus Lewe
