= European Cockpit Association =

European trade union representing pilots

- Formation: 1991
- Headquarters: Brussels, Belgium
- Members: 38 member associations
- President: Tanja Harter
- Secretary General: Ignacio Plaza Sevillano
- Website: www.eurocockpit.be

The European Cockpit Association (ECA) is a trade union that represents European pilots. It has pursued the improvement of aviation policies to the benefit of its members, and has frequently spoken out in length on topics such as the impact of flight-time limitations on its members, the erosion of aviation safety culture, and the necessity of regulating the emerging subsector of unmanned aerial vehicles (UAVs).

== History ==
The European Cockpit Association (ECA) was established during 1991 with its headquarters being located in the City of Brussels, Belgium. The association's express purpose is to advocate for the improvement of European policies in all areas of aviation that affect pilots, such as safety, pilot licensing, air operations, fair competition, international air traffic agreements, air traffic management and employment conditions. By June 2019, the ECA represented in excess of 40,000 European pilots from the National Pilot Associations across 36 European states.

During January 2003, the ECA carried out a public protest against draft flight-time limitations proposed by the European Union; the association had concerns that some of the proposed duty periods may be excessively long and thus could lead to pilot fatigue. In January 2012, together with the European Transport Workers' Federation, the ECA organised an EU-wide demonstration against the new flight-time rules proposed by the European Aviation Safety Agency; when the proposed legislation was enacted during the following year, the ECA described it as being "a sad day for European flight safety". Furthermore, the ECA submitted related evidence to support the legislative process of several European nations. In November of the same year, the ECA published a study on pilot fatigue, finding that four in ten pilots had fallen asleep in the cockpit. In February 2017, the association claimed that the new EU working directives were being incorrectly applied by the industry.

During 2014, the ECA spoke out against the implementation of the recently introduced multi-crew pilot licence, singling out the alleged negative impact on flight training via a greater reliance on simulators over real-world experience. In December 2016, the association critiqued the potential link between budget airlines and alleged reductions in operational safety margins. Over the following years, the ECA has supported industrial action amongst its members that are employed by the budget airline Ryanair, leading to a relatively confrontational relationship between the association and the airline. The EVA has also disputed claims of a pilot shortage, observing that such a shortage was frequently being used to justify weakening legislation to the detriment of its members.

The ECA has maintained a long-term interest in the deployment of unmanned aerial vehicles (UAVs) in European airspace, and the potential ramifications thereof. In 2015, the association issued a list of proposals for regulating this emerging industry. During October 2016, the ECA published a study into the safe integration of UAV traffic and methods of minimising the impact on conventional aircraft. During the following year, it released a separate study into the potential impact of mid-air collisions between UAVs and manned aircraft. That same year, the ECA's report into the threat posed by cyber attacks, along with proposed policy responses, was also issued.

Following an injunction granted to the airline Air Malta in July 2016 against industrial action by its pilots, the ECA criticised the outcome as a fundamental danger to the rights of citizens. During the Boeing 737 MAX groundings following the loss of two aircraft in quick succession to the same design flaw, ECA President Jon Horne called of the European Aviation Safety Agency (EASA) to adopt a stronger stance in vetting Federal Aviation Administration (FAA) plans to return the type to service, and claimed that members were losing faith in the regulator over its allegedly passive approach to its certification.

During the COVID-19 pandemic, tens of thousands of workers in the aviation industry lost their jobs. The ECA repeatedly spoke out on the issue, warning governments against favouring looser employment contracts, and observing that roughly 20% of pilots were already employed in such a manner. The association also released a report of envisioned policy suggestions to address the industry's crisis.

== See also ==
- International Federation of Air Line Pilots' Associations
- Ryanair Pilot Group
