= Eva Lohse =

German politician

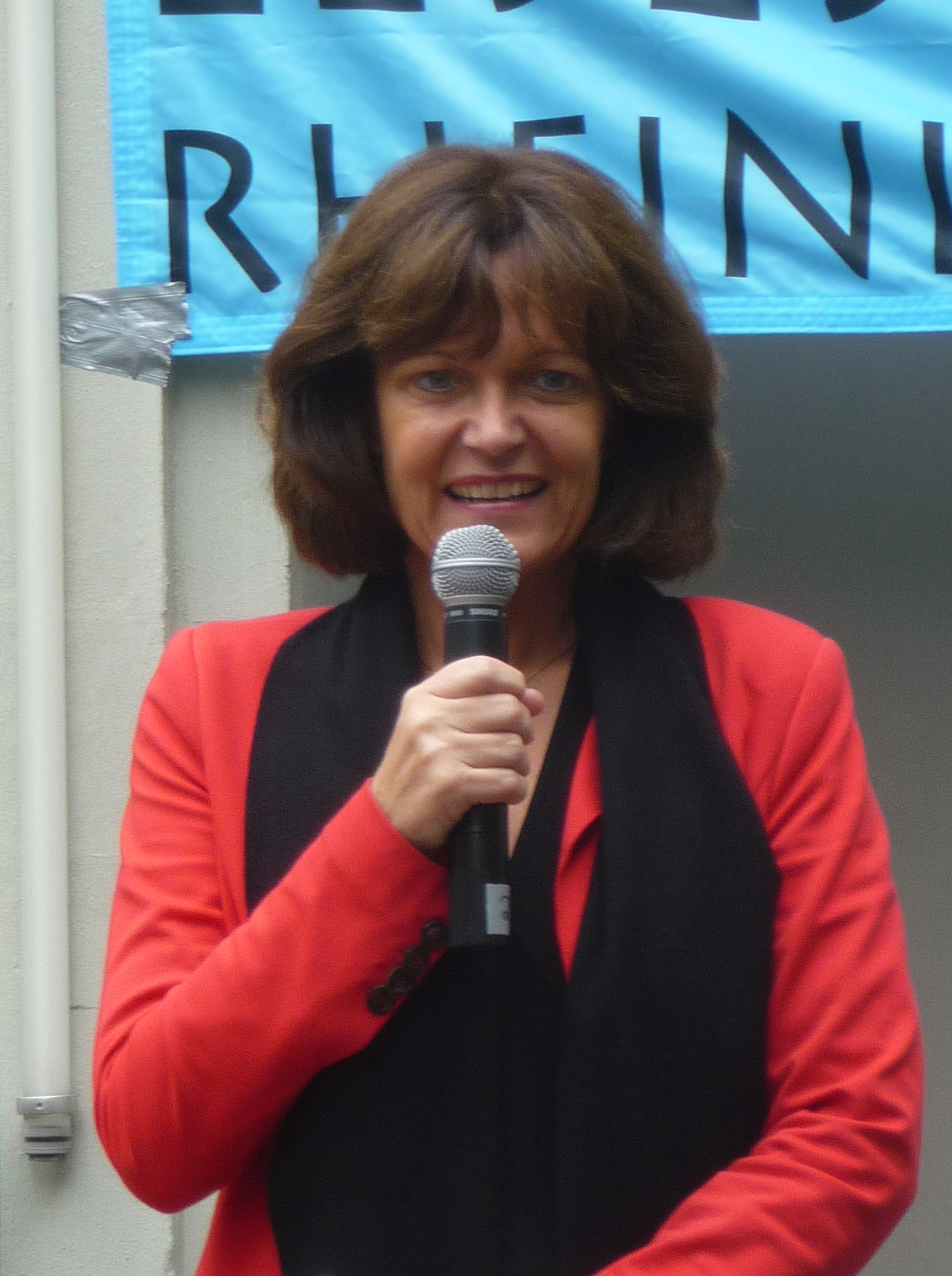
Eva Lohse (2012)

Eva Lohse (née Müller-Tamm; born 23 January 1956 in Ludwigshafen) is a German politician of the Christian Democratic Union (CDU). She was the mayor (Oberbürgermeisterin) of Ludwigshafen from 2002 to 2017.

In addition to her work as Mayor, Lohse served as president of the Deutscher Städtetag from June 2015 to December 2017. The group is the head organization and lobby group for 3400 German cities vis-à-vis the Cabinet of Germany, the German Bundestag, the Bundesrat of Germany, the European Union (EU) and many organizations.

== Early life and career ==
Lohse was born in Ludwigshafen in 1956. She studied law at the universities of Heidelberg, Geneva and Freiburg. After the first state exam she studied administrative law at the Verwaltungshochschule Speyer. In 1995 she graduated as a Doctor of Law. From 1987 to 1996 she hold different positions in the regional administration, in the Ministry of the Interior of the State of Rhineland-Palatinate and the police department Rheinpfalz in Ludwigshafen. From 1996 to 2001, Lohse was a lecturer at the Fachhochschule of Public Administration, Department of Labor Administration, in Mannheim with the subjects of administrative, employment and social law.

== Political career ==
Lohse joined the Christian Democratic Union and was elected to the local city council of her birthplace Ludwigshafen in 1994.

In May 2001, Lohse was elected mayor of Ludwigshafen, in the first round with 55.51% of the votes. She became the city's first directly elected woman Oberbürgermeister and the first Christian Democrat in this position since 1945. In 2004, she was in discussion to become the top candidate for the CDU in the state elections in Rhineland-Palatinate. However, she refused to run against the chairman of the party, Christoph Böhr. On 7 June 2009 she was re-elected in the first round with 53.7% of the votes.

In 2015, Federal Minister for Economic Affairs and Energy Sigmar Gabriel appointed Lohse to the government's advisory board on the Transatlantic Trade and Investment Partnership (TTIP).

In November 2016, Lohse announced that she would not run for the next mayor's election. Her term of office ended in December 2017.

== Life after politics ==
Since 2018, Lohse has been a member of the so-called Limbach Commission (Advisory Commission on the return of cultural property seized as a result of Nazi persecution, especially Jewish property), a panel convened by the German government to give recommendations on restitution claims regarding art works stolen or purchased under duress by the Nazis.

== Other activities ==
- 2005–2017 Präsidium des Deutschen Städtetages, member
- 2006–2017 Verband Region Rhein-Neckar, president
- 2006–2017 Verein Zukunft Metropolregion Rhein Neckar e.V., vice-president
- 2012–2017 Deutscher Sparkassen- und Giroverband, vice-president
- 2013–2015 Deutscher Städtetag, vice-president

== Personal life ==
Lohse is married and has two daughters.
