= Ryanair Pilot Group =

Unrecognised Irish labour union

The Ryanair Pilot Group (RPG) is an unrecognised labour union formed in 2012 by pilots working for the low cost Irish airline, Ryanair. The three founders were Evert Van Zwol, John Goss and Ted Murphy. As of 2013, more than 50% of pilots in Ryanair were registered and represented by the RPG in all categories. By 2020, RPG had effectively ceased to operate, referring pilots who visited its website to their national pilot associations.

The "Ryanair Transnational Pilot Group" (RTPG), formed 17 March 2018, was active as of 2024.

== Recognition ==
In the Irish Supreme Court case of Ryanair Limited v Labour Court & Impact in 2007, Mr Justice Geoghegan ruled that Ryanair was entitled not to deal with trade unions.

As of October 2013, Ryanair had not officially recognised the Ryanair Pilot Group. In an August 2013 interview, Ryanair CEO Michael O'Leary dismissed the group as a "joke" and claimed that the pilots group was an attempt by pilot unions from other airlines to unionise Ryanair. Following a comment from the Ryanair CEO Michael O'Leary in August 2013 in which he agreed to meet with the RPG if more than 1601 pilots were registered with them, an invitation to talk was sent by the RPG. In response, Ryanair released a short statement, stating that "We don’t comment on the activity or false claims of KLM or Aer Lingus pilots,” a reference to the five-member interim council of the Ryanair Pilot Group consisting of non-Ryanair pilots.
