= Zapiekanka =

Open-face sandwich made of half of a baguette or other long roll of bread

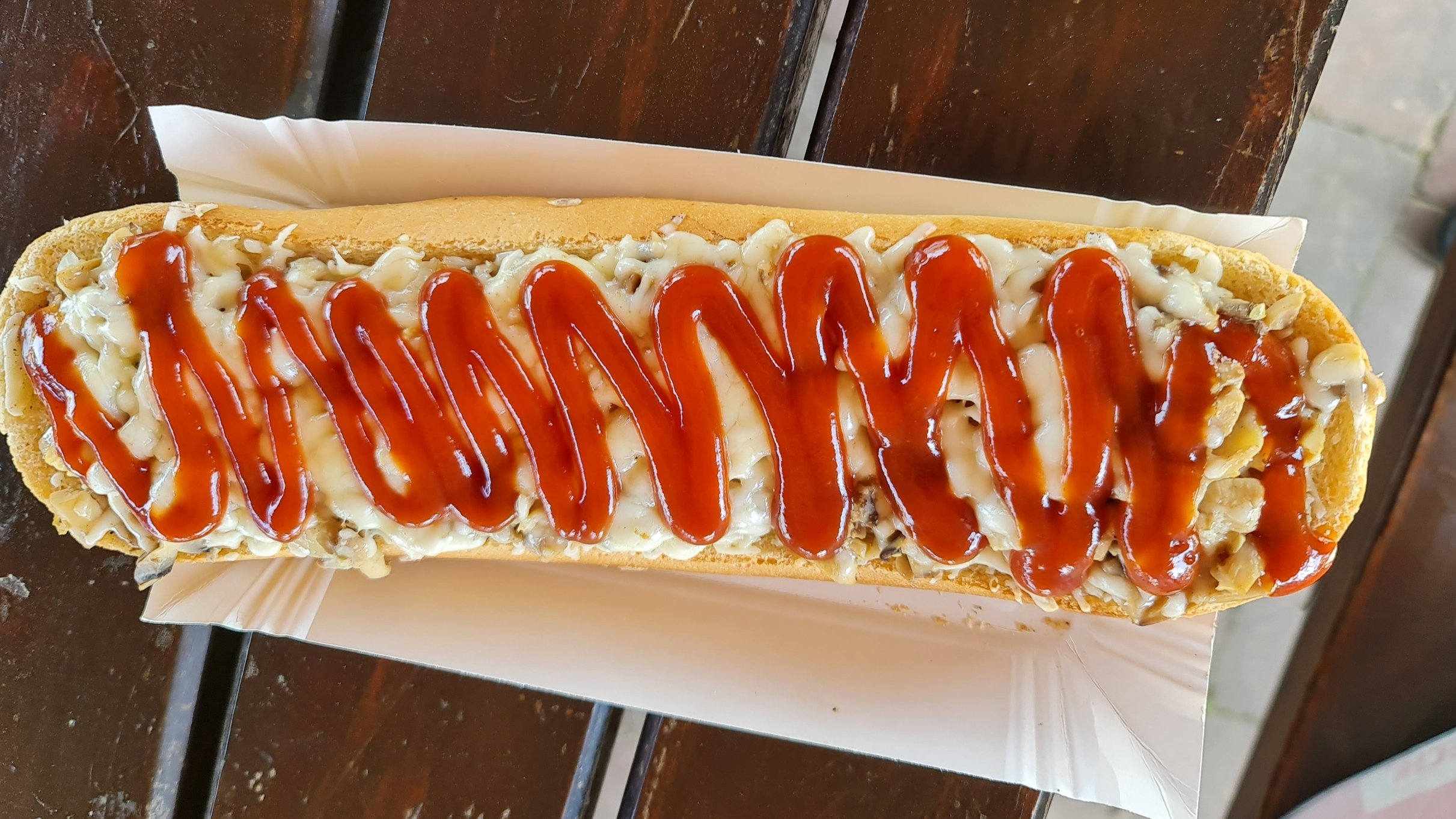
- A typical zapiekanka served on a paper tray
- Type: Street food
- Place of origin: Poland
- Associated cuisine: Polish
- Invented: 1970s
- Serving temperature: Hot
- Main ingredients: Baguette, button mushrooms, cheese
- Ingredients generally used: Ketchup

A zapiekanka (Polish pronunciation: [za.pjɛ.ˈkan.ka]; plural: zapiekanki, pronounced [za.pjɛ.ˈkan.kʲi]) is a toasted open-face sandwich made of a sliced baguette or other long roll of bread, topped with sautéed white mushrooms, cheese and sometimes other ingredients, such as ham. Served hot with ketchup, it has been a popular street food in Poland since the 1970s.

== Etymology ==
The Polish word zapiekanka comes from the verb zapiekać, which means "to bake a dish so that its ingredients combine, and a crispy, browned crust forms on top," (Note: In Polish: piec potrawę w taki sposób, że jej składniki łączą się ze sobą, a na wierzchu powstaje chrupiąca, przyrumieniona warstwa.) and may refer to various casseroles and other foods prepared in this manner.

== Preparation and varieties ==
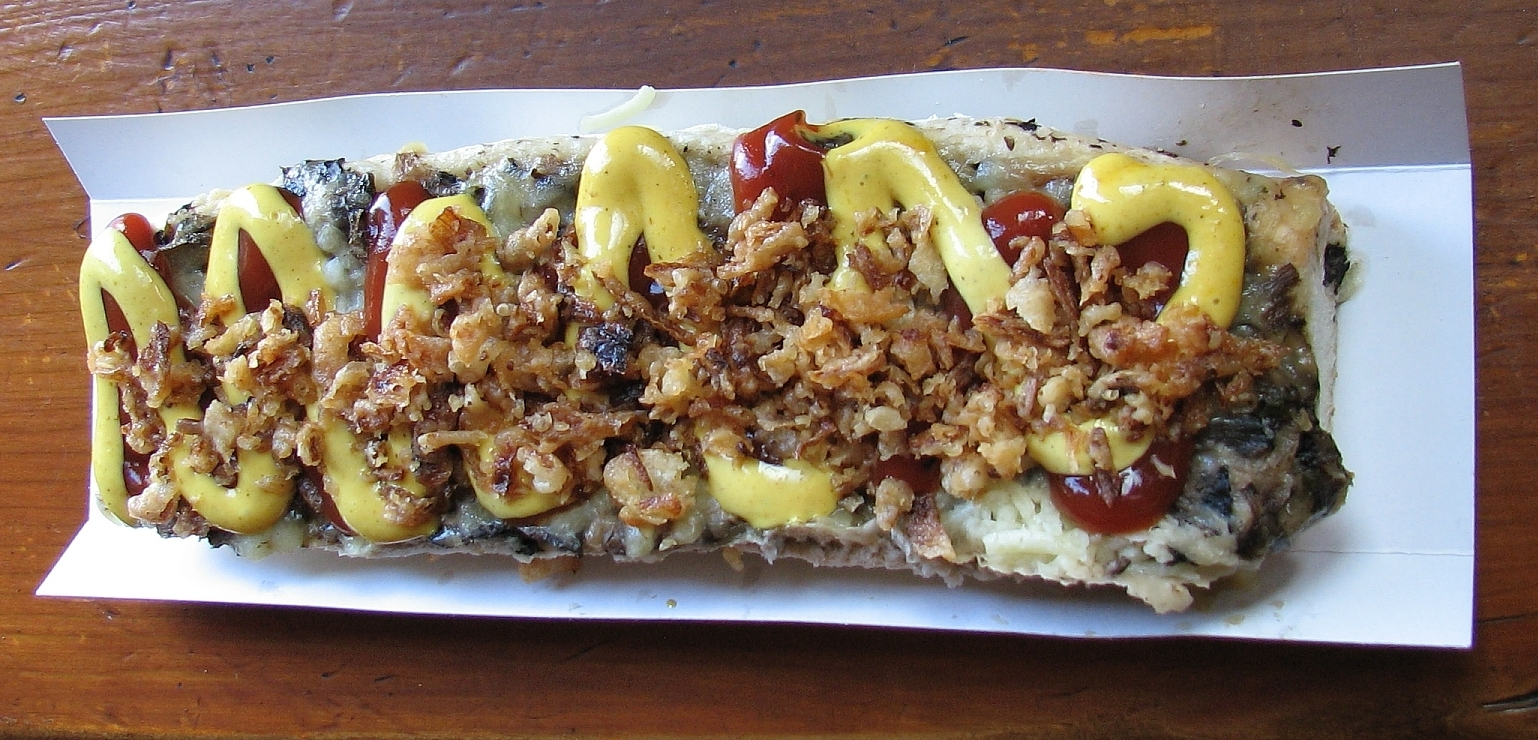
A zapiekanka topped with ketchup, mustard and chopped, browned onions

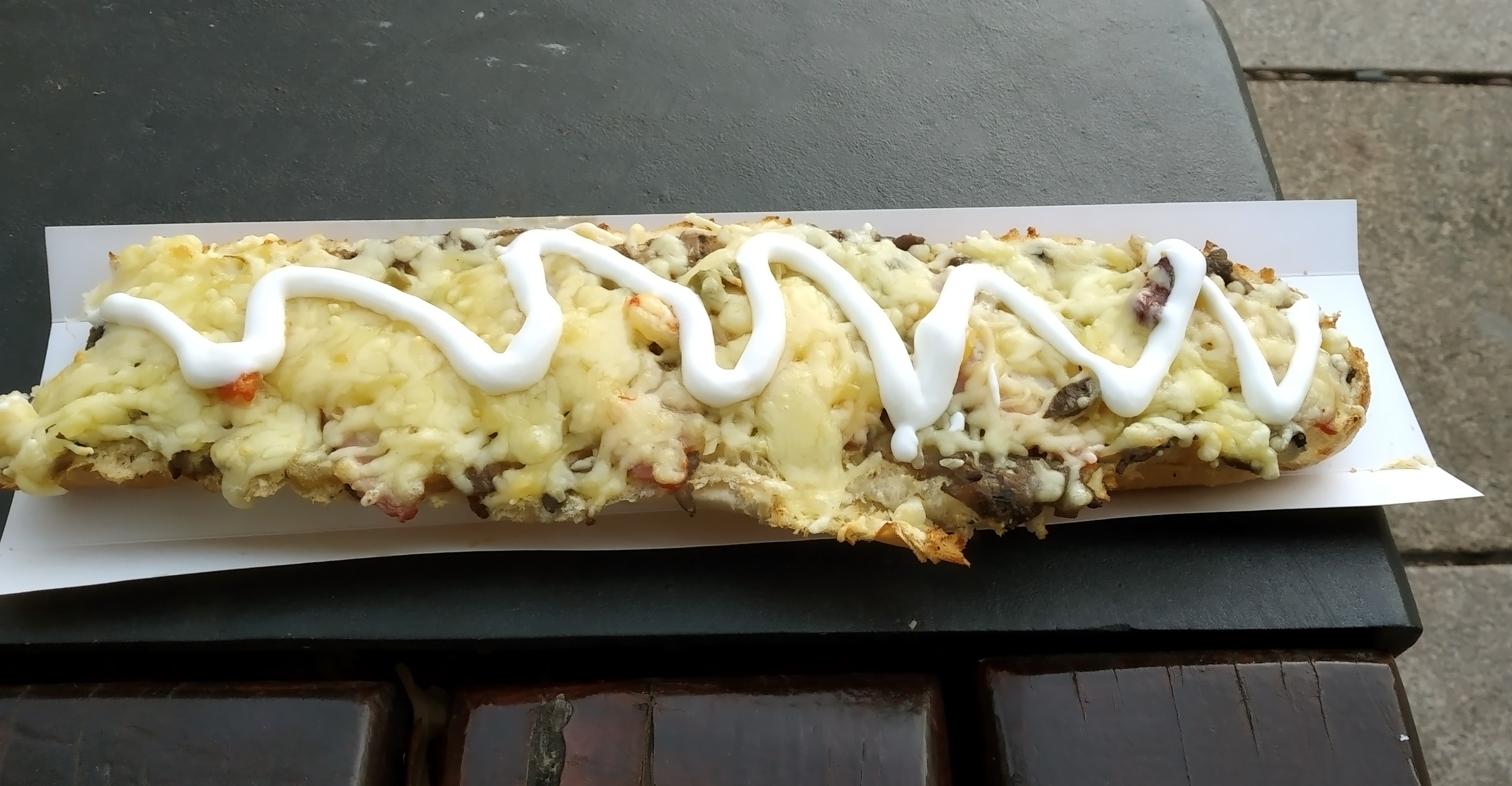
A cheese and mushrooms zapiekanka topped with mayonnaise

A typical zapiekanka is made from one half of a baguette, or any other long roll of white bread, cut lengthwise, as for a submarine sandwich. It may be up to 50 centimetres (20 in) long. The bread is topped with sliced, sautéed white mushrooms and grated cheese to form an open-face sandwich, which is then toasted until the bread becomes crisp and the cheese melts. Hard, mature yellow cheese with high fat content that melts well in heat, such as Gouda, Edam, Emmental, Tilsit or cheddar, is best for this purpose; Polish smoked sheep milk cheese, such as oscypek, is also a popular choice. A zapiekanka is best served hot. The typical garnish is tomato ketchup, usually splattered on the cheese in a generous amount.

Oven-baked zapiekanki are available with additional ingredients and sauces, which has earned them the moniker of "Polish pizza". Varieties include "diablo" with bacon, pickled cucumbers and spicy sauce; "Gypsy" with ham and sweet and sour sauce; "Greek" with olives and feta cheese; and "Hawaiian" with pineapple and barbecue sauce; patrons may also choose their own combinations. While the zapiekanka is primarily a street food, home-made versions also exist, such as the "student's zapiekanka", made from bread, cheese and whatever else is at hand at the moment.

== History ==
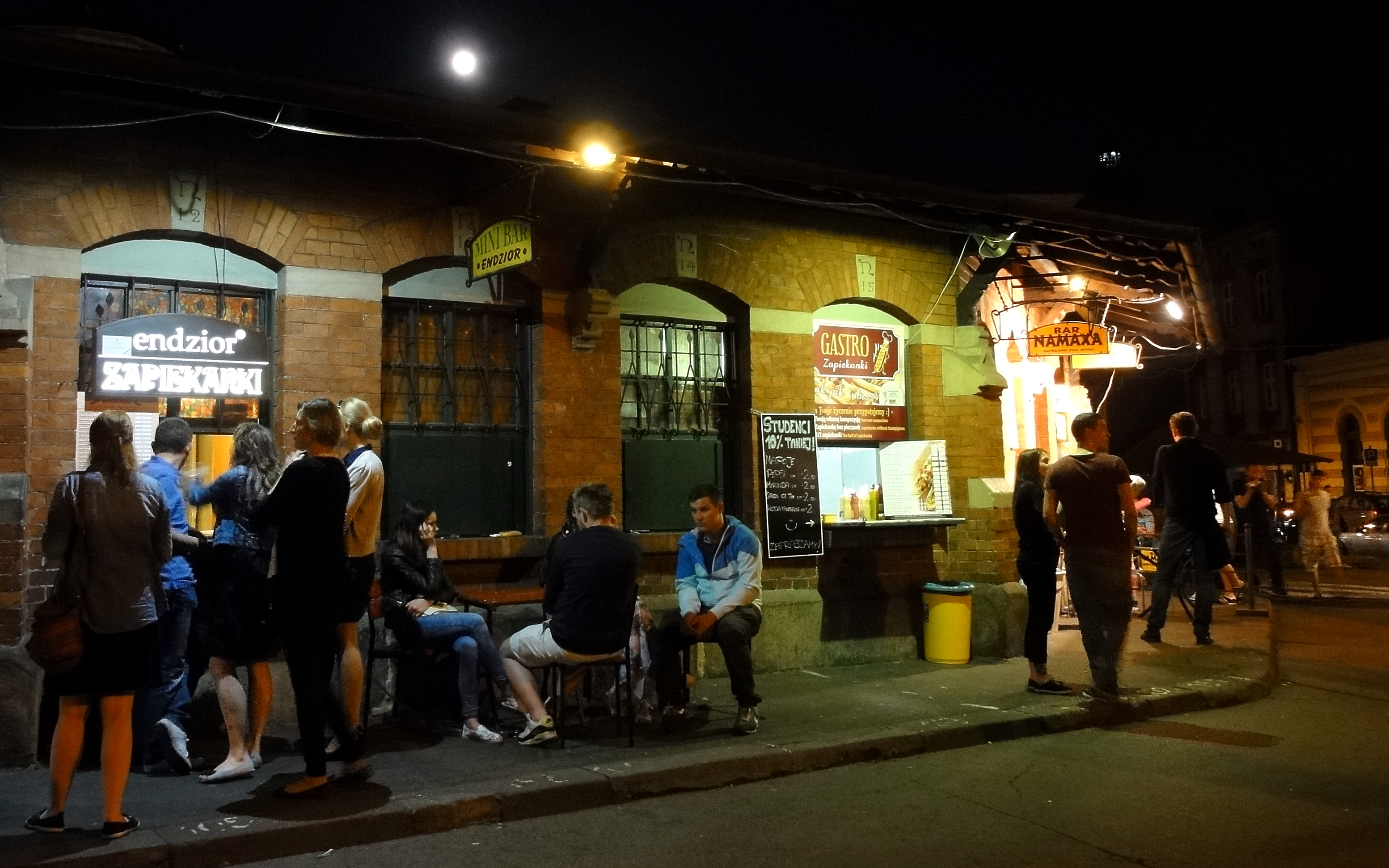
Zapiekanka stalls in Plac Nowy, Kazimierz, Kraków, at night

Zapiekanki first appeared in the streets of Polish towns in the 1970s under the leadership of Edward Gierek, who bought the license for the production of baguettes from the French. This purchase can be linked to his upbringing, as he spent his formative years in France and Belgium. Moreover, under his leadership of the Polish United Workers' Party, authorities of the Polish People's Republic allowed a degree of private enterprise in the catering industry. This move led to quick proliferation of small family-owned foodservice establishments, known in Polish as mała gastronomia, or "small gastronomy". Their spread continued during the food shortages of the following decade. They usually took the form of stands or travel trailers turned food trucks serving zapiekanki along with simple dishes of Polish cuisine, such as kiełbasa sausage, boiled ham hock or tripe soup, and American fast food staples, like hot dogs, hamburgers, ice cream, and French fries.

Demand for zapiekanki fell with the reintroduction of the market economy in the 1990s, but they were still served by the few "small gastronomies" that survived the competition with large fast food chains. Some zapiekanka stands even attained cult following, such as those located in Plac Nowy (New Square) in the Kazimierz district of Kraków. Today, zapiekanki remain a relatively popular street food and student dish.

== See also ==
- Polish cuisine
- Pizza
- Cebularz

== Sources ==
1. Żmigrodzki, Piotr (ed.). "Zapiekać". Wielki słownik języka polskiego (in Polish). Instytut Języka Polskiego PAN.
2. "Zapiekanka". Słownik języka polskiego (in Polish). Wydawnictwo Naukowe PWN.
3. Bush, Austin (2012). The World's Best Street Food: Where to Find it & How to Make it. Lonely Planet. p. 170. ISBN 978-1742205939.
4. Chojnacka, Urszula (2013). "Sery do zapiekania: Gorąca odsłona serów" [Cheeses for baking: The hot role of cheeses]. Forum Mleczarskie Handel (in Polish). 5 (60). Nathusius Investments.
5. Kraig, Bruce; Sen, Colleen Taylor (2013). Street Food Around the World: An Encyclopedia of Food and Culture. Santa Barbara: ABC-CLIO. pp. 280, 471. ISBN 978-1-59884-954-7.
6. Mętrak-Ruda, Natalia (2020). "Polish Food 101 – Zapiekanka". Culture.pl. Adam Mickiewicz Institute.
7. Kuliś, Agata (2013). "Zapiekanka zapiekance nierówna" [One zapiekanka is not equal to another]. Street Food Polska (in Polish). Sfp14web.
8. Chwalba, Andrzej, ed. (2008). Obyczaje w Polsce: Od średniowiecza do czasów współczesnych [Customs of Poland: From the Middle Ages to Modern Times] (in Polish). Warszawa: Wydawnictwo Naukowe PWN. p. 380. ISBN 978-83-01-14253-7.
9. "Zapiekanki z "keczukiem" wprost z przyczepy kempingowej: Początki małej gastronomii" [Zapiekanki with "ketchuk" straight from a travel trailer: Beginnings of "small gastronomy"]. TVP Info (in Polish). Telewizja Polska. 2015-03-28. Archived from the original on 2016-10-18.
10. Applebaum, Anne (2013-08-01). "Revolutionary eating in Poland". The Washington Post.
11. Vorhees, Mara (2010). Krakow Encounter. Lonely Planet. ISBN 978-1741048612.
