= Polish Economy Hall of Fame =

Award for Polish economists

The membership in the Polish Economy Hall of Fame (Polish: Galeria Chwały Polskiej Ekonomii) is an award for Polish economists.

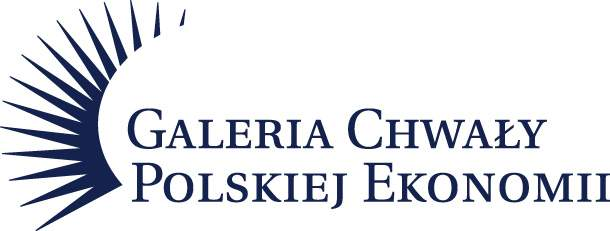
Awards' logo

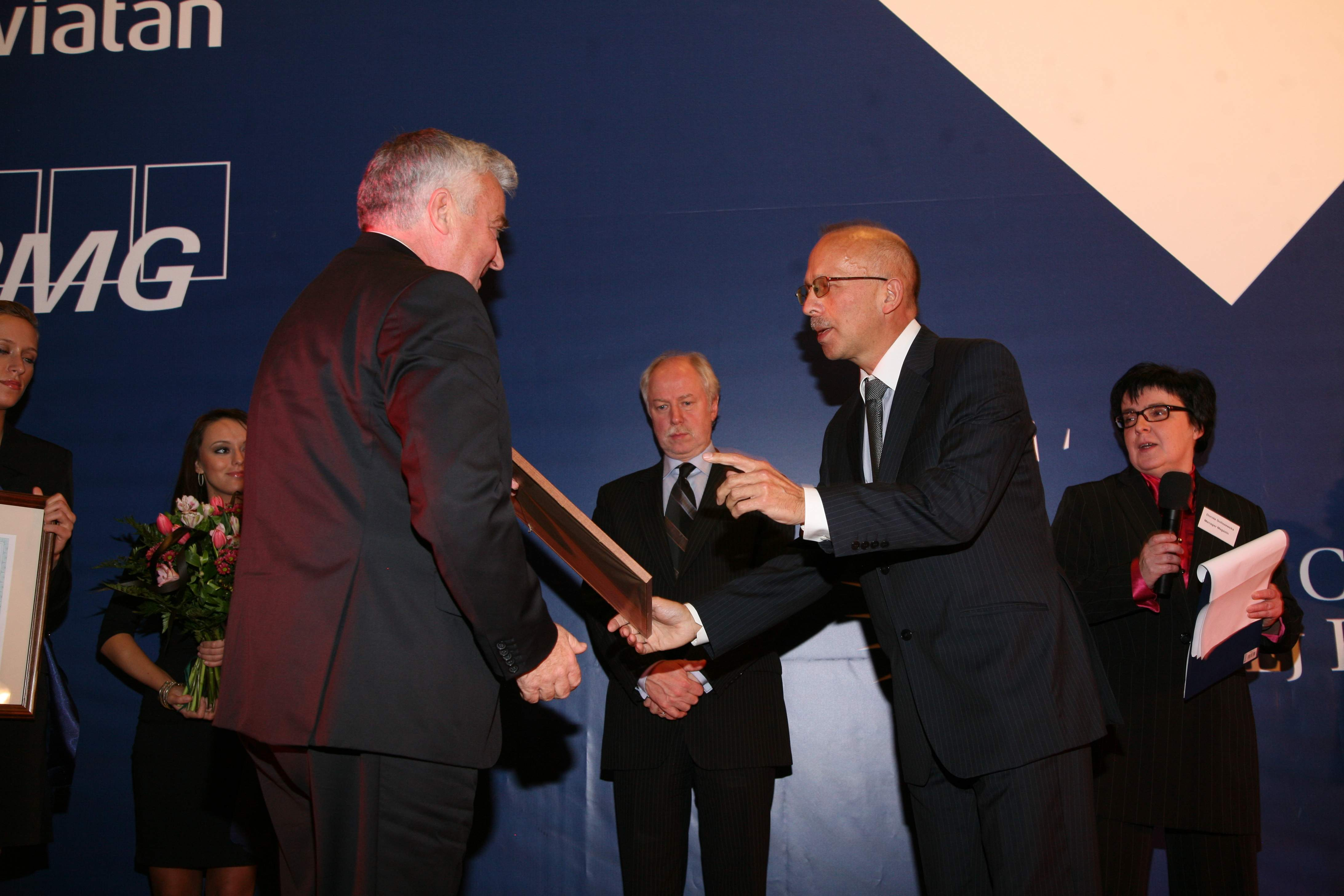
Former president of the Warsaw Stock Exchange, Wiesław Rozłucki becomes a member in Galeria Chwały

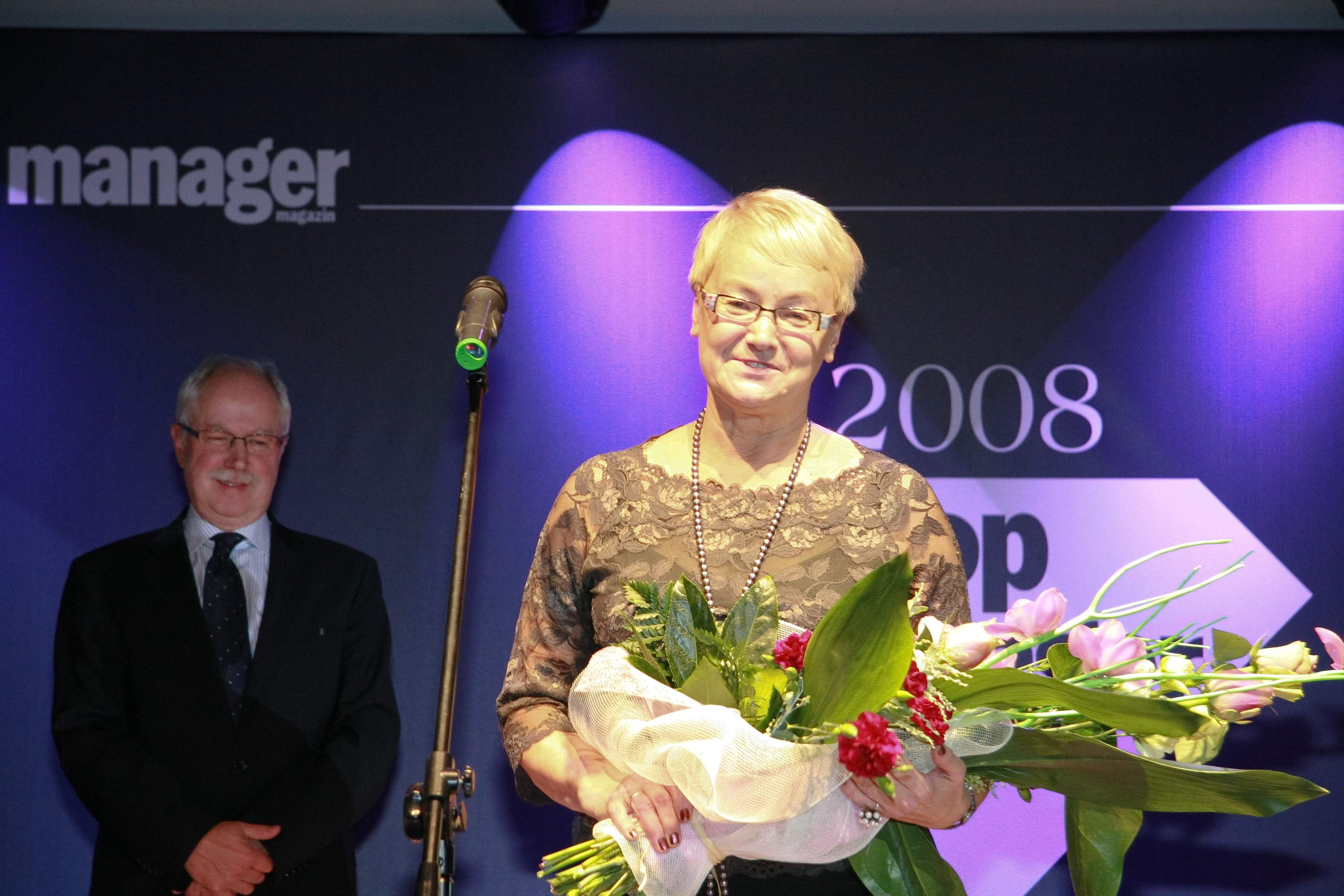
Award winner and new member of Galeria Chwaly was Henryka Bochniarz from the Employers Association Lewiatan

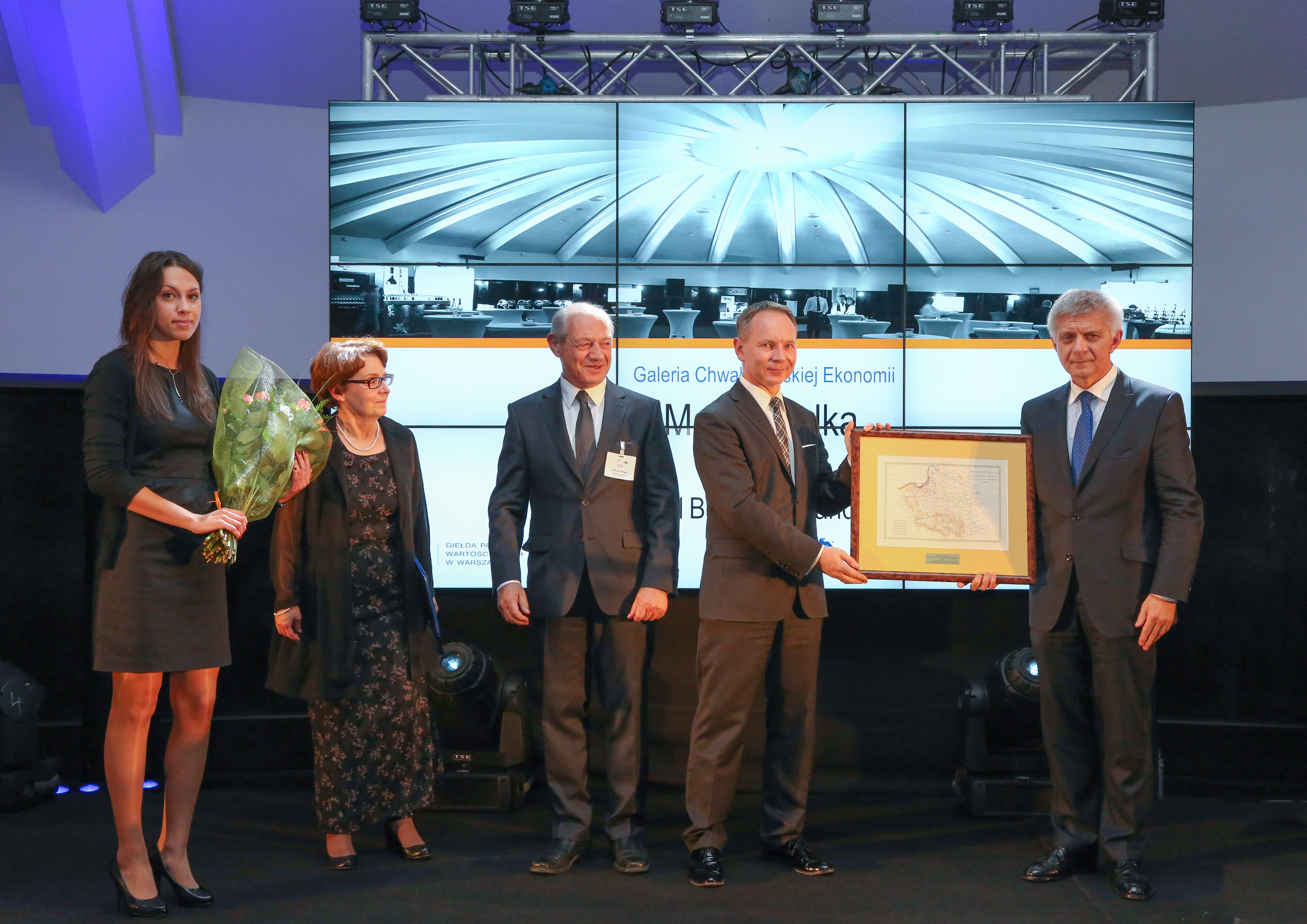
2013 ceremony, from left: Dorota Goliszewska, Henryk Orfinger, Adam Maciejewski, Marek Belka

== Idea ==
In 2005 the Polish edition of German business magazine Manager Magazin established Galeria Chwały Polskiej Ekonomii (translated: Hall of Fame of the Polish economy), which is similar to a business and economic hall of fame, established by Manager Magazin in Germany in 1970. Since 2010 the business magazine Strategie endows the award. By becoming a member in Galeria Chwały once a year an outstanding Polish economist is awarded for lifetime achievements for the Polish economy.

Since 2012 the Association of Finance Directors in Poland FINEXA (Stowarzyszenie Dyrektorów Finansowych Finexa) is organizer of the award. The ceremony is held at the annual congress of the organization in Warsaw. The new organizer established an enlarged jury.

== Organizer and jury ==
Galeria Chwały is organized by the association FINEXA. The jury is composed of leading representatives of the Polish economy:

- Adam Budnikowski, former rector of the Warsaw School of Economics
- Paweł Domosławski, president of FINEXA
- Mieczysław Groszek, member of the board at the Association of Polish Banks (Związek Banków Polskich)
- Alicja Kornasiewicz, former vice-minister at the Polish Ministry of State Treasury
- Adam Maciejewski, chairman of the board at the Warsaw Stock Exchange
- Krzysztof Obłój, economist and university teacher (University of Warsaw, Kozminski University)
- Henryk Orfinger, chairman of the supervisory board at the Polish Federation of Employers Lewiatan (Polska Konfederacja Pracodawców Prywatnych Lewiatan)
- Witold Orłowski, rector at the Business School of the Warsaw University of Technology

== Sculptures and artist ==
The heads of the Galeria Chwały-members are in a scale 1:1.2 as bronze-sculptures produced. The production process is based on plasticine-form technic. The heads are presented to the public in a permanent exhibition.

The sculptor is Jerzy Nowakowski, an artist living in Poznań. He was born in 1963 in Bydgoszcz and studied at the Poznań Academy of Fine Arts under Prof Józef Kopczyński (1930-2006).

Since 1993 Nowakowski's work has been presented at single and group exhibitions in Poland and Germany. He is author of ordered by cities (Oborniki, Wolsztyn, Grodzisk Wielkopolski, Nowy Tomyśl, sculpture of Fryderyk Chopin and others) and institutions (for example The International Book Fair in Warsaw) art pieces (sculptures, award symbols, memory plates, ..)

The sculptures, fixed on metal columns, are exhibited permanently in the main hall of the Warsaw Stock Exchange.

== Laureates ==
Members of Galeria Chwały so far are:

- Leszek Balcerowicz, a former Deputy Prime Minister and Chairman of the Polish National Bank (award winner 2006)
- Marek Belka, former Polish prime minister and president of the National Bank of Poland (2013)
- Henryka Bochniarz, candidate for Polish presidency in 2005 and president of the Polish Employers Association Lewiatan (award winner 2008)
- Władysław Grabski (1874-1938), Polish politician (prime minister) and economist (award winner 2005, posthum)
- Eugeniusz Kwiatkowski (1888–1974), Polish politician and economist (award winner 2005, posthum)
- Wiesław Rozłucki (*1947), president of the Warsaw Stock Exchange 1991 - 2006 (award winner 2007)

== See also ==
- List of economics awards
