= Manager Magazin (Poland) =

Polish business magazine

The Polish business title Manager Magazin – Edycja Polska (manager magazin EDYCJA POLSKA) was published under license by the German title Manager Magazin from 2004 to 2008 and was one of two major business magazines in Poland at that time.

== History and profile ==
The title was published by a joint venture between Hamburg based Manager Magazin Verlagsgesellschaft mbH (Spiegel group) and Warsaw publishing house Infor SA. Wydawnictwo Infor Manager Sp. z o.o. published its first issue of the Polish Manager Magazin in November 2004 (issue 12/2004). In 2007 Spiegel group purchased Infor's shares and rebranded the publishing house into Manager Media Sp.z o.o..

The magazine focussed on upper managers in Polish business. The title had a print run of 50,000 copies, copy price at 9.80 Złoty and sold around 30,000 copies at outlets and via subscription. The magazine was registered at the Polish auditing association ZKDP. The editor-in-chief for the launch was business journalist Jan Bazyl Lipsczyc. In 2006 Dorota Goliszewska became editor-in-chief. Deputy editors were Dorota Kornacka and Piotr Lemberg. The CEO was Philipp Busch, and later Nikolaus von Nathusius.

Beside the main title Manager Magazin, the company published special issues on specifically focused topics. With the brand Manager Eventy several kinds of events were organized also: gala events for proprietary-award ceremonies, seminars and workshops. In October 2008 a conference with nobelist Joseph Stiglitz was organized in Warsaw.

A change in the Spiegel-group management in 2008 resulted in a change of their foreign investments strategy. Based on the decision to generally withdraw from foreign countries activities, and due to an expected major decrease of advertising revenues following the economic contraction resulting from the 2008 financial crisis, the title and company were closed down at the end of 2008.

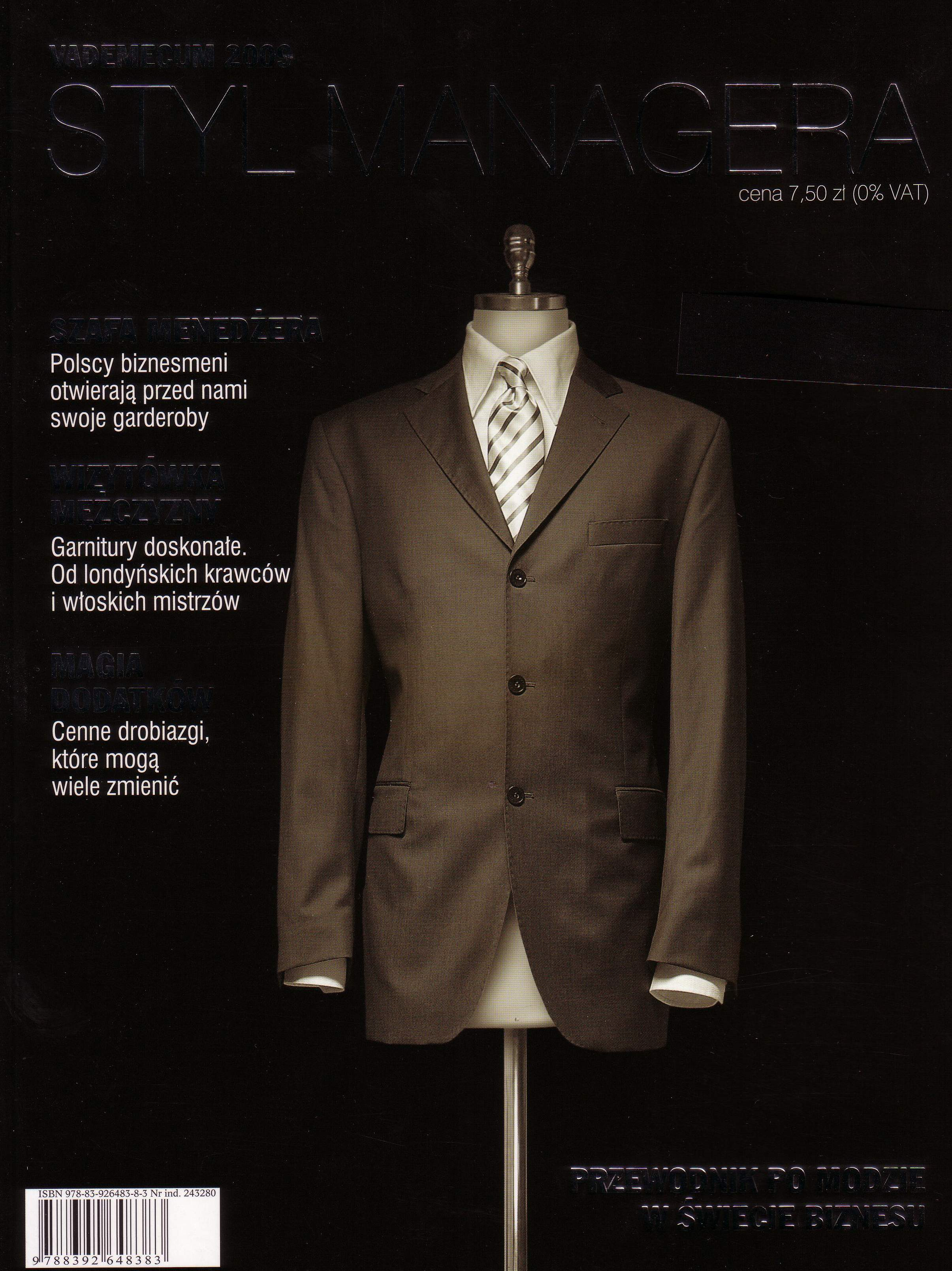
Cover of special issue: Vademecum Styl Managera, here edition from 2009 (published in October 2008)

== Special issues ==
Other publications of the company were also closed down:

- Connoisseur – lifestyle-quarterly
- Vademecum Finanse Osobiste (vademecum finanse osobiste) – yearbook concerning private finance topics
- Vademecum Przedsiębiorcy (vademecum przedsiębiorcy) – entrepreneurs' yearbook
- Vademecum Styl Managera (VADEMECUM STYL MANAGERA) – lifestyle yearbook

== Awards ==
- Top Manager – award in four categories for extraordinary management achievements in stock noted companies. Winners have been Dariusz Miłek (CCC), Piotr Walter (TVN), Jan Kolański (Jutrzenka), Janusz Płocica (Zelmer), Maciej Witucki (TP SA) and others.
- Galeria Chwały Polskiej Ekonomii – an award for economists. Recipients include Henryka Bochniarz and Leszek Balcerowicz
- Top 500 – Gwiazdy Nowej Europy – at the international economic and political summit Forum Ekonomiczne in Krynica-Zdrój presented award for massive growing companies in Central and Eastern Europe.
- Dyrektor Finansowe, an award for CFOs. A co-operation with the Polish subsidiary of insurance company Euler Hermes
