= Józef Haller Bench =

Monument in Szczecin, Poland

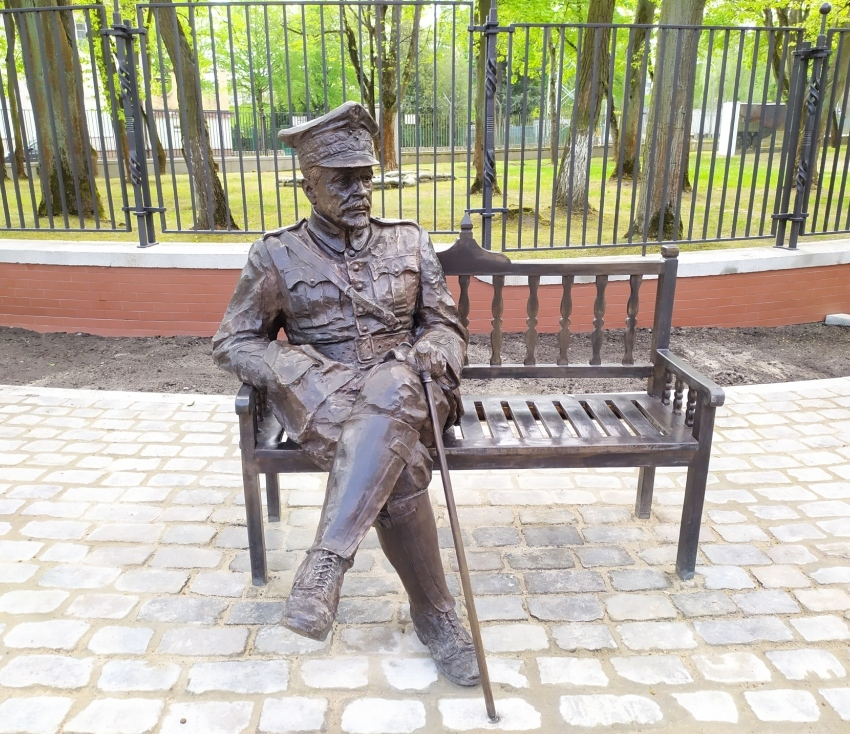
- The monument in 2021.
- Interactive map of Józef Haller Bench
- Location: 250 Polish Armed Forces Avenue, Szczecin, Poland
- Coordinates: 53°27′40.64″N 14°29′50.795″E
- Designer: Dorota Dziekiewicz-Pilich
- Type: Statue, bench monument
- Material: Bronze
- Opening date: 14 May 2021
- Dedicated to: Józef Haller

The Józef Haller Bench (Polish: Ławeczka Józefa Hallera) is a monument in Szczecin, Poland, placed in front of the baracks of the 12th Mechanised Brigade at 250 Polish Armed Forces Avenue, and the corner of Jarzyńskiego Street, within the Głębokie-Pilchowo neighbourhood. It is dedicated to Józef Haller, a 19th- and 20th-century military officer who was the commander of the Blue Army during the First World War. The monument has a form of a statue depicted sitting on a bench. It was designed by Dorota Dziekiewicz-Pilich, and unveiled on 14 May 2021.

== History ==
The monument dedicated was proposed by the 12th Mechanised Brigade of the Polish Armed Forces, which has Józef Haller as its patrone. It was financed together with the Institute of National Remembrance. The monument was designed by Dorota Dziekiewicz-Pilich and unveiled on 14 May 2021. The statue and bench were based on a 1920 photo of Haller in Zakopane, Poland.

== Overview ==
The monument consists of a bronze statue of Józef Haller. He is depicted wearing a military uniform a rogatywka hat, sitting on the left side of a bench, with his legs crossed, and holding a cane. The monument in front of the baracks of the 12th Mechanised Brigade at 250 Polish Armed Forces Avenue, and the corner of Jarzyńskiego Street.
