= FINEXA =

- FINEXA - Stowarzyszenie Dyrektorów Finansowych
- Formation: November 17, 2011; 14 years ago
- Type: State ownership
- Headquarters: Warshaw, Poland
- Website: finexa.org

FINEXA - Stowarzyszenie Dyrektorów Finansowych is a Polish national association for finance directors. The association is active in regulatory processes, education and career-building. Headquartered in Warsaw, the association has a chapter in Gdańsk.

== History ==
FINEXA was founded on 2 August 2011 by 36 foundation members. It was registered in Warsaw on 17 November 2011. The official organ of the association is the business magazine Strategie.

The organisation is run by an eight-man board and a five-man supervisory board. The current chairman of the board is Paweł Domosławski, and the supervisory board is headed by Nikolaus von Nathusius. Since 2012, FINEXA has been a member institute of the International Association of Financial Executives Institutes (IAFEI). The Polish Association of Risk Managers (POLRISK) is a member of FINEXA. The Polish Corporate Treasurers Association (PCTA) and FINEXA co-operate in regulatory process-matters.

Since 2012 FINEXA has been the organizer of the award Galeria Chwały Polskiej Ekonomii; the ceremony is held at the annual conference of the organization in Warsaw. In 2013 FINEXA was host of the 43rd IAFEI World Congress in Warsaw.
