= The Intangibles of Leadership =

2010 book by Richard A. Davis

- Hardcover edition
- Author: Richard Davis
- Language: English
- Subject: Leadership, business
- Genre: Non-fiction
- Publisher: Jossey-Bass
- Publication date: July 26, 2010
- Publication place: Canada
- Media type: Hardcover
- Pages: 256
- ISBN: 978-0-470-67915-9
- OCLC: 940705974

The Intangibles of Leadership: The 10 Qualities of Superior Executive Performance is a book on business leadership, written by management psychologist Richard A. Davis, Ph.D. The book was published on July 26, 2010, by Jossey-Bass.

== Author ==
Davis is a licensed Industrial/Organizational Psychologist and President/CEO of Kilberry Leadership Advisors. He has been consulting to senior executives for the past 10 years. Previously, he partnered with the Toronto office of RHR International. He has lectured on organizational behavior at the University of Western Ontario, at the Schulich School of Business, and at the Rotman School of Business at the University of Toronto, and has been an invited speaker at high-profile organizations such as the National Association of Corporate Directors, Financial Executives International, and the Conference Board of Canada.

Davis has been cited widely in the popular media, including CNN, CNBC, Harvard Business Review, BusinessWeek, CFO Magazine, The Globe and Mail, Entrepreneur, The Wall Street Journal, Forbes, CanadaAM, and Report on Business TV.

== Synopsis ==
The Intangibles of Leadership uncovers patterns in the attributes that truly distinguish those who succeed at the top. After more than a decade of senior executive assessments, CEO interviews, and proprietary research, Davis found that extraordinary leaders possess certain characteristics that fall between the lines of existing leadership models, and are fundamental to executive success. Davis explains each of these qualities, the people who exemplify them, how to detect them in others, and how to develop the subtle characteristics that will enable leaders to stand out from the pack. The book has been highly reviewed and was named as a "Top Business Book of 2010 by Library Journal".

The Ten Intangibles outlined in the book are:

1. Wisdom
2. Will
3. Executive Maturity
4. Integrity
5. Social Judgment
6. Presence
7. Self-Insight
8. Self-Efficacy
9. Fortitude
10. Fallibility

According to the author, the book is a practical atlas of the characteristics that mostly define extraordinary leaders and their underlying psychological mechanisms. It was designed as a mirror to help executives think about how they approach leadership and gain insights that can enable them to grow and develop.
