= Krzysztof Obłój =

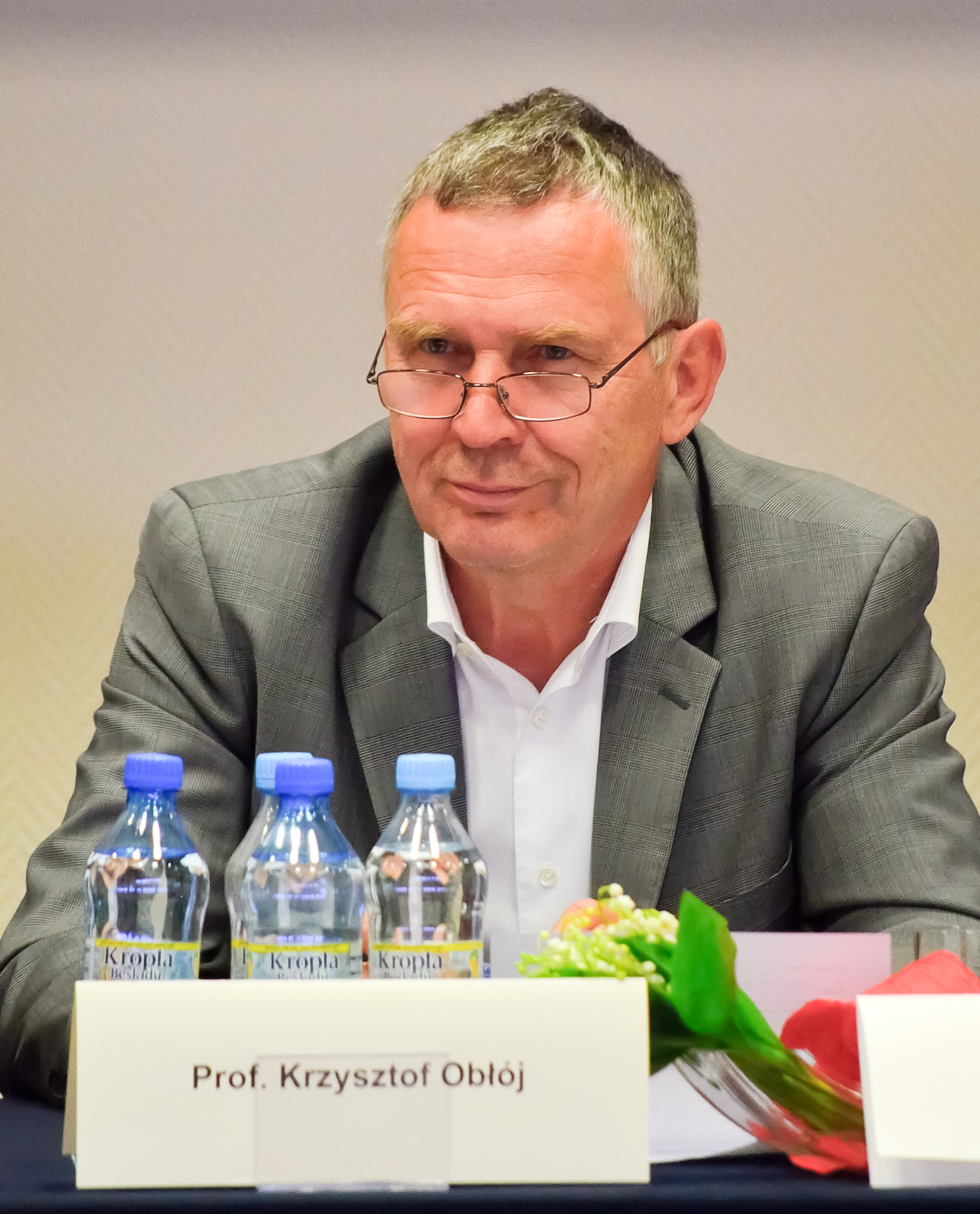
Krzysztof Obłój (2014)

Krzysztof Obłój (born October 30, 1954) is a Polish economist and university teacher, with a broad research area including world economy, institutional environment of business, competition and entrepreneurship. He specializes in organization culture, structure and process, internal organizational analysis and organizational strategy. Obłój is Chair of the Institute for Strategic Management and International Management (Zakład Zarządzania Strategicznego i Międzynarodowego) at the University of Warsaw and Head of the Department of Business Strategy at the Kozminski University in Warsaw.

== Biography ==
The economist is son of Józef Obłój (1918–2012), a chemist. He is a graduate of Szkoła Planowania i Statystyki in Warsaw. He worked as research assistant at the Warsaw University; since 1977 as teaching assistant/assistant professor. 1987 he gained his habilitation in strategic management. Since 1995 he is professor at Kozminski University. From 1995 until 2009 he was Director at Warsaw University and 1993/1994 he served as President of the European International Business Association.

Obłój has been a guest professor in academies and universities in several countries. He was or is lecturer at Chinese University of Hong Kong, Kyiv Mohyla Business School, University of Illinois, State University of New York, Norwegian School of Management, Bates College, Franklin and Marshall College, Tel Aviv University, Mississippi State University, Colorado State University, Harvard University, Yale University, Sun Yat-sen University, University of Kiel, ESCP-EAP, Henley-on-Thames, Ecole Nationale des Ponts et Chaussees, Central Connecticut State University, Norwegian School of Management and Duquesne University.

In the United States his books “Management Systems” (1993) and “Winning: Continuous Improvement Theory in High Performance Organizations” (1995) have been published. Obłój acts as consultant and supervisory board member (partly as chairman) in Polish companies or local subsidiaries of corporations like Asea Brown Boveri, LG Group, Reckitt Benckiser, Alior Bank SA, Prochem SA, Agora SA, Ambra SA, Eurobank S.A., Impel SA, NFI Foksal SA, PGF SA, PKN Orlen SA, Polmos Lublin SA or PZU SA.

Obłój is a jury member at Galeria Chwały Polskiej Ekonomii.

Between November 2012 and 5 August 2015, he was an advisor to the President of Poland.
