= Strategie (magazine) =

Strategie - Pismo Dyrektorów Finansowych
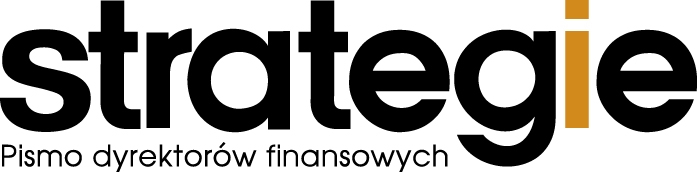
- Editor-in-chief: Jakub Stępień
- Staff writers: Alicja Hendler, Małgorzata Remisziewicz
- Categories: Business
- Circulation: 10,200
- Publisher: Dorota Goliszewska
- First issue: 1/2011 (15 December 2010)
- Final issue: 4/2012 (15 June 2012)
- Company: Nathusius Investments
- Country: Poland
- Based in: Warsaw
- Language: Polish
- ISSN: 2082-1875

The monthly title Strategie - Pismo Dyrektorów Finansowych was a magazine for corporate financial managers in Poland. With a printrun of 10 200 the business-to-business-title was distributed via controlled circulation. The magazine received in May 2012 an award (“Wyróżnienie”) by the Polish Publishers Association at the “GrandFront 2011” competition for its cover design and was closed down shortly after.

== Editorial partners ==
The editorial team of Strategie co-operated with industry- and consultancy-specialists. Contributors included representatives of the Polish Employers Association Lewiatan (Rada Podatkowa), PCTA Polish Corporate Treasurers Association, Warsaw School of Economics, Warsaw University of Technology, Deloitte, Ernst & Young, KPMG, PricewaterhouseCoopers and Capgemini. Feuilletonists have been the economists Rafał Antczak and Witold Orłowski. The magazine was the official organ of two Polish associations: POLRISK, the Polish risk managers association and FINEXA, Poland's association for financial directors.

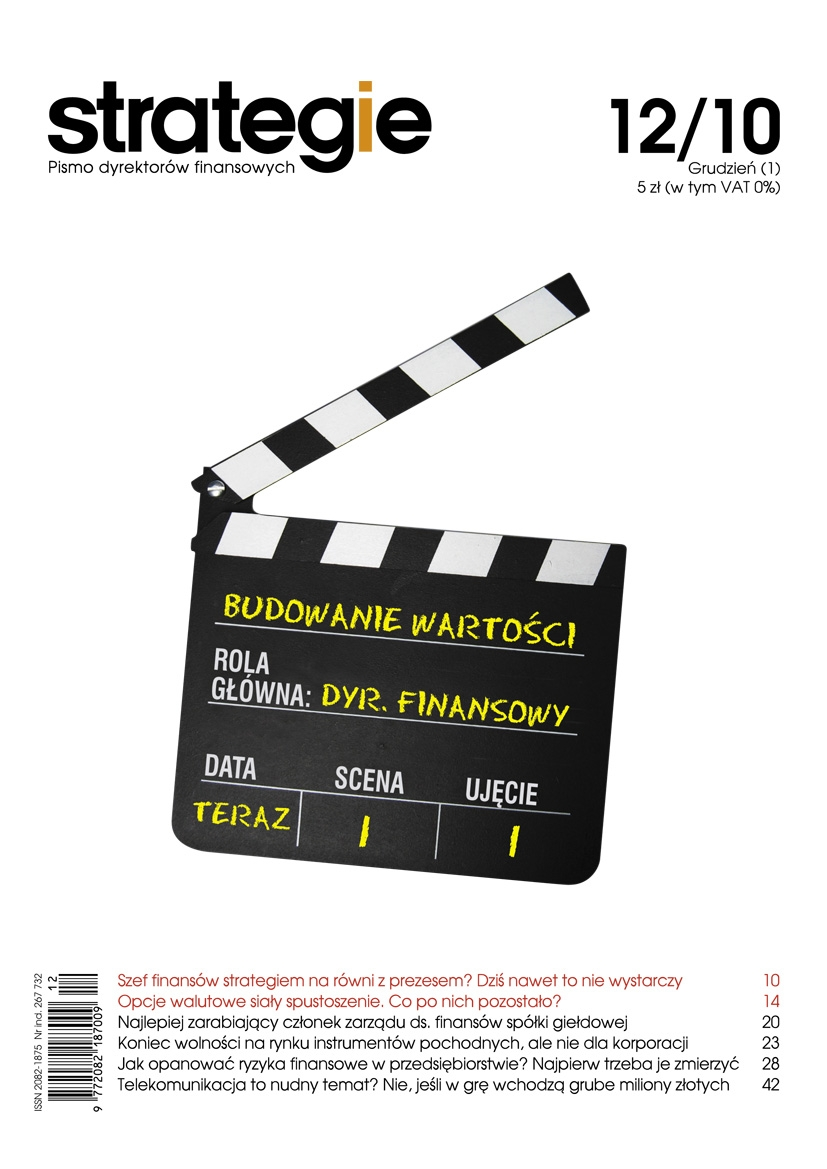
magazine cover, issue December 2010

== Readership and content ==
Target group of the magazine have been finance directors (incl CFOs, treasurers and chief controllers) in approximately 30,000 Polish small and medium companies with a turnover of more than zl 20 million. The content of the magazine focussed on corporate financial topics (cash and risk-management, controlling, accounting, audit) and company strategic topics like outsourcing, IT and investment risk management. The publishing house is a member of the Polish Publishers Association (Izba Wydawców Prasy).

== Related operations ==
Beside publishing the magazine, an online community (Strategie - Społeczność Dyrektorów Finansowych) at LinkedIn and an event-organization with regular local meetings in major towns in Poland (Strategie - Forum Dyrektorów Finansowych) was set up. The event-activities included the organization of the award-ceremony for Galeria Chwały Polskiej Ekonomii.
