= Dorota Dziekiewicz-Pilich =

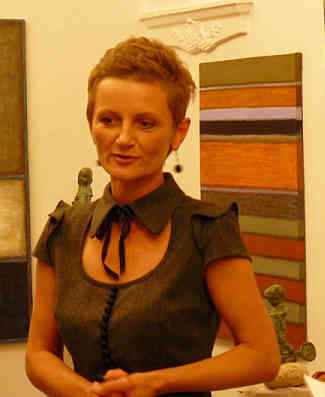
- Born: Dorota Dziekiewicz; 25 June 1969; Szczecinek, Poland
- Education: Józef Petruk and Józef Kopczyński
- Known for: sculpture, drawing
- Notable work: Statuette of Fryderyk (annual award in Polish music)

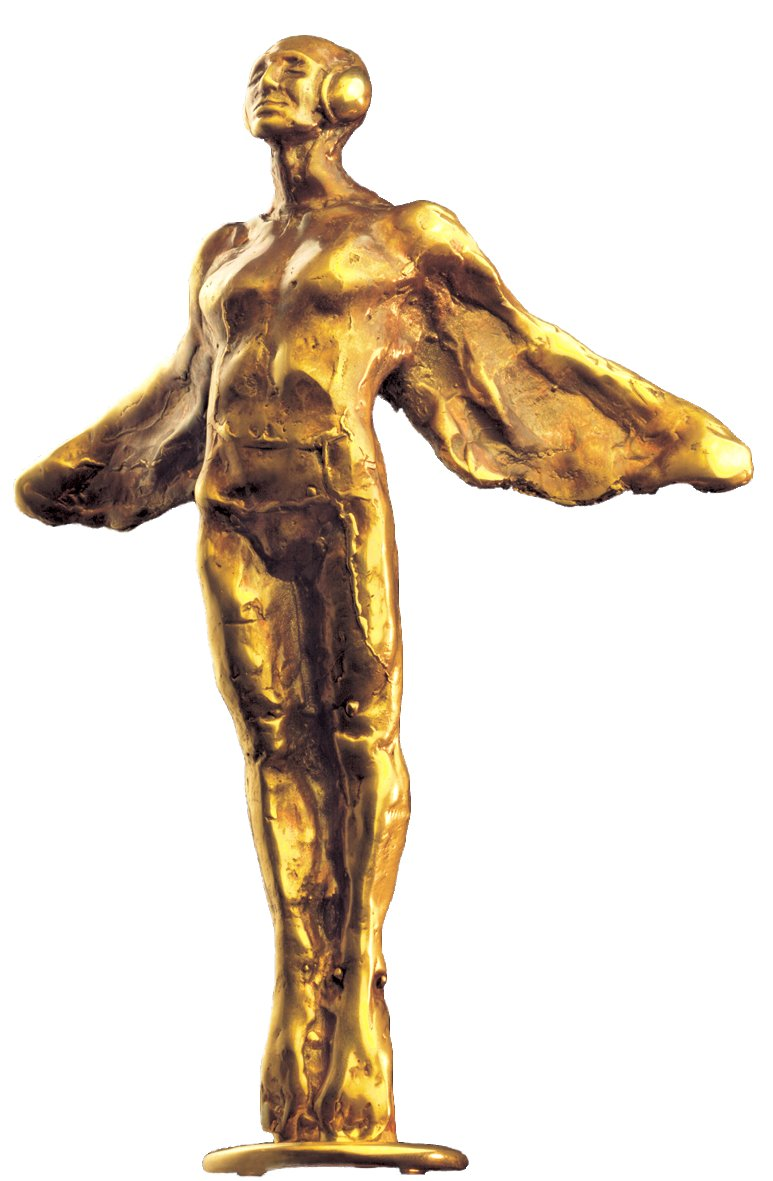
Fryderyk

Dorota Dziekiewicz-Pilich [dɔrɔˈta d͡ʑɛkiɛˈvit͡ʂ piˈlix] (born 25 June 1969 in Szczecinek, Poland) is a Polish sculptor and drawing artist.

== Education ==
She passed the matura exam in Liceum im. Księżnej Elżbiety (Lyceum of Princess Elizabeth) in Szczecinek and later Academy of Fine Arts in Poznań. She learned sculpturing from Professor Józef Petruk and Professor Józef Kopczyński. She graduated in 1993.

== Style and type of sculptures ==
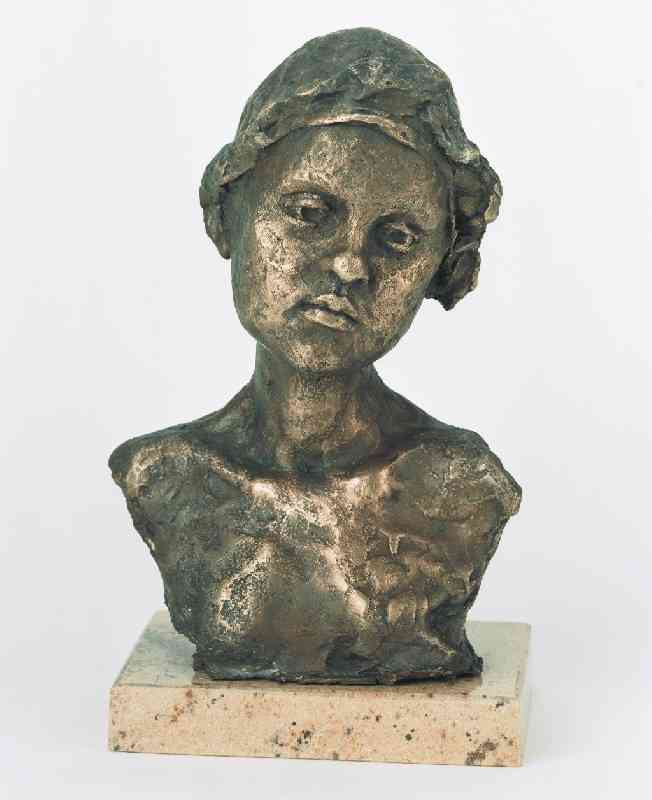
Portrait of Madzia

Dziekiewicz-Pilich creates sculptures mainly made of bronze with the lost-wax casting technique. Her favourite types of sculptures are portrait and grotesque. She also makes small forms like: statuettes, medals, commemorative plaques, jewellery and other items.

An important place in Dorota Dziekiewicz-Pilich creations take children topics. She made many sculptures, which in realistic or grotesque ways portray children, their play, dance, dalliance and mischief.

Dziekiewicz-Pilich also creates large sculpturing works like statues: concept and project of the statue commemorating a visit of John Paul II in Piłsudski square, Warsaw (2005), concept of fontain titled "Mali muzykanci z Pruszkowa" (Little musicians from Pruszków) (2009) and the statue of Adam Giedrys in Szczecinek (2009).

== Awards and achievements ==
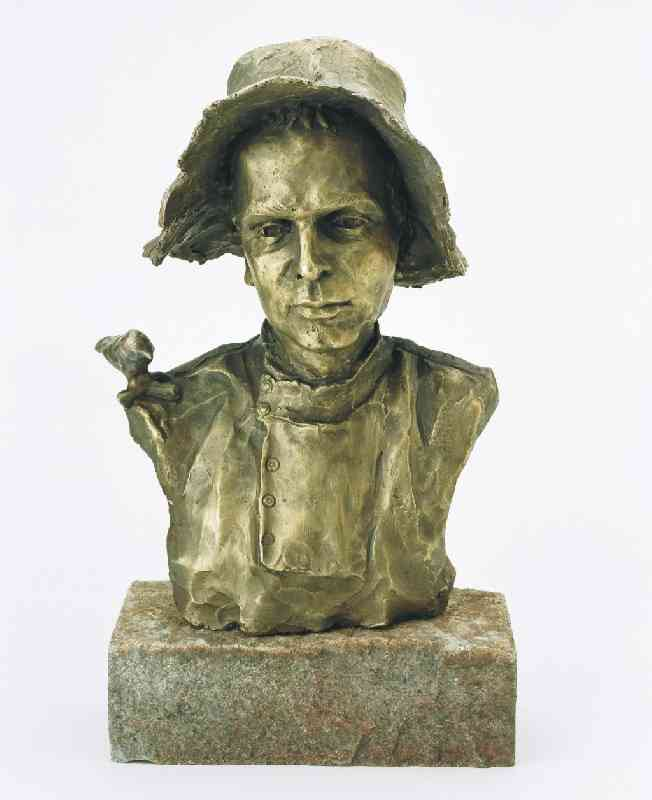
Portrait of Grzegorz Ciechowski

In 1993, she was awarded the first prize for the statuette of Bytów town.

In 1996 she won the competition for a concept of the Polish annual music award – the Fryderyk statuette. In 1998, she presented an exhibition titled "Twarze Fryderyków" (Faces of the Fryderyks) held in Galeria Zapiecek. The exhibition presented personalised Fryderyk statuettes and small sculptures of the awarded: Stanisław Sojka, Grzegorz Ciechowski, Grzegorz Turnau, Kayah and Justyna Steczkowska.

In 1997, then Warsaw Mayor Marcin Święcicki chose her work "Mała skrzypaczka" (Little violinist) as an award for the best Polish violinist in the International Tadeusz Wroński Solo Violin Competition.

In 2006 she received third prize in a competition run by the Warsaw Mayor for a concept commemorating the visit of John Paul II.

In 2009 she won the contest for the statue of Adam Giedrys in Szczecinek.

== Works ==
She presented her sculptures and drawing a few dozen of times in individual and group exhibitions in Poland and Europe. Her bronze works are held in private collections in many countries including Germany, Holland, France and Malta.

=== Exhibitions ===
- 1994 – individual, Art Galeria, Szczecinek
- 1995 – individual, Galeria P., Pruszków
- 1995 – individual, Radziejowice Palace
- 1996 – individual, Galeria "Zamek", Ostróda
- 1996 – group, "Rzeźba w przestrzeni publicznej i prywatnej" (Sculpture in public and private space), Galeria Domu Artysty Plastyka, Warsaw
- 1997 – individual, "Fryderyk, muzyka, przestrzeń" (Fryderyk, music, space), Galeria Zapiecek, Warsaw
- 1997 – individual, Wystawa Jednego Wieczoru "Fryderyk, muzyka, przestrzeń" (Single Evening Exhibition "Fryderyk, music, space"), foyer of Sala Kongresowa, Warsaw
- 1998 – individual, "Twarze Fryderyków" (Faces of Fryderyks), Galeria Zapiecek, Warsaw
- 1998 – individual, Wystawa Jednego Wieczoru "Twarze Fryderyków" (Single Evening Exhibition "Faces of Fryderyks"), foyer of Sala Kongresowa, Warsaw
- 1998 – group, "Bliźniemu swemu..." (To your neighbour...), exhibition and auction for Towarzystwo Pomocy im. św. Brata Alberta, Teatr Miejski im. Wandy Siemaszkowej, Rzeszów
- 1998 – group, "Bliscy i Oddaleni" (Those near and far away), Art Galeria, Szczecinek w Szczecinku and Bergen op Zoom (Holland)
- 1999–2000 – group, "Bliźniemu swemu... 2000" (To your neighbour... 2000), Galeria STUDIO, Pałac Kultury i Nauki (Warsaw), Muzeum Historyczne Miasta Gdańska, Muzeum Archidiecezjalne (Wrocław), Galeria Sztuki Artemis (Kraków), Teatr im. Wandy Siemaszkowej (Rzeszów)
- 2001 – individual, "Dziecko" (Child), Bergen op Zoom (Holland) and Galeria Zapiecek (Warsaw)
- 2001–2002 – group, "Bliźniemu swemu... 2002" (To your neighbour... 2002), Zachęta Narodowa Galeria Sztuki (Warsaw), Galeria Miejska Arsenał (Poznań), Muzeum Archidiecezjalne (Wrocław), Pałac Sztuki (Kraków), Muzeum Sztuki (Łódź), Teatr im. Wandy Siemaszkowej (Rzeszów)
- 2002 – group, 30th Jubilee of Galeria Zapiecek, Warsaw
- 2003 – individual, Pałac Sztuki, Kraków
- 2003 – individual, during Witold Hulewicz award ceremony, Dom Literatury, Warsaw
- 2005–2006 – several group exhibitions – "Sztuka w 18 aktach" (Play in 18 acts), "Tutaj malowane" (Painted here), "Dialog ze sztuką" (Dialogue with art) organised by Galeria Tess, Pruszków
- 2009 – individual, Galeria Zapiecek, Warsaw

=== Significant artistic achievements and works ===
- 1996 – Fryderyk statuette
- 1997 – "Mała skrzypaczka" (Little violinist) used as a first prize the International Tadeusz Wroński Solo Violin Competition
- 2000 – plaque commemorating Gen. Kazimierz Sosnkowski, Katedra Polowa Wojska Polskiego, Warsaw
- 2002 – statuette promoting the national action "Cała Polska czyta dzieciom" (All of Poland reads to kids)
- 2005 – special prize for statue/concept commemorating the visit of John Paul II, Warsaw
- 2006 – medal for Fundacja Urszuli Jaworskiej Dawców Szpiku
- 2007 – statuette for the award of Stowarzyszenie Filmowców Polskich for extraordinary artistic achievements
- 2008 – medal awarded on Światowy Dzień Chorego (World Day of the Sick)
- 2009 – statue of Adam Giedrys, Szczecinek

=== Other works ===
- statuette for the Astrid Lindgren contest for best Polish book for children
- statuette for bank "Bank Gospodarki Żywnościowej"
- statuette for foundation "Fundacja Warty i Kredyt Banku"
- medal for Pruszków city council
- statuette for Otwock city council
- statuette and medal for Polish branch of the financial firm Deloitte & Touche
- statuette for Polish branch of Panasonic
- statuette for action "Gryf Swoim Dzieciom"
