= Mexican Institute of Finance Executives =

- Instituto Mexicano de Ejecutivos de Finanzas
- Formation: 1961; 65 years ago
- Type: Nonprofit professional association
- Legal status: Institution
- Purpose: Development of financial professionals
- Location: Mexico City, Mexico
- Region served: Mexico
- Official language: Spanish
- Subsidiaries: IMEF Universitario and IMEF Nueva Generación.
- Website: www.imef.org.mx

Mexican Institute of Finance Executives (IMEF) (Spanish: Instituto Mexicano de Ejecutivos de Finanzas) is a Mexican professional association that brings together finance executives that are members of the Mexican financial sector. The organisation has more than 20 groups in major cities across Mexico with 17 technical committees.

The Mexican Institute of Financial Executives (IMEF) is a founding member of the International Association of Financial Executives Institutes (IAFEI) and takes credit for research papers and articles with both Mexican and international authors. Since 1984, the IMEF has awarded several prizes to participants in its research investigation contest and since 2003 in these have been in conjunction with Deloitte.

== History ==
On September 21, 1961, the Mexican Institute of Financial Executives (IMEF) was created as a non-profit organization dedicated to the technical development of its associates in the financial area.

The foundation of the institute was established by the influence, leadership and significance of its partners since 1961 who have contributed to strengthen the Institute and its position in Mexico. In the years 1971, 1981, 1991, 2001 and 2012 IMEF hosted of the annual IAFEI World Congress.

Two chapters considered as subdivision were created by the institute in an effort to link the younger generations of future financial executives in the country; these are IMEF Universitario and IMEF Nueva Generación.

== IMEF Index for Business Environment ==
The Mexican Institute of Financial Executives created, in a joint venture with the Mexican government agency, the INEGI, the IMEF Index for Business Environment (Spanish: Indicador IMEF del Entorno Empresarial) (IIEEM) making it the first private sector index which has the technical regulation and support of a public institution in México.

The IIEEM is a factory index that measures the business climate around the expected economic environment or trajectory direction of economic activity in the very short term, this index is divided in two subdivisions; manufacturing and non-manufacturing. The IIEEM emulates the methodology of that in the Institute for Supply Management (ISM) of United States.

The data that this index compiles is provided by the enterprises that have IMEF associates, gathered along with business organizations of outstanding relevance in the area such as Confederación Patronal de la República Mexicana (Coparmex), American Chamber of Commerce, the Asociación Nacional de la Industria del Plástico (ANIPAC), the Cámara Nacional de la Industria de la Transformación (CANACINTRA) and the Confederación de Cámaras Industriales (CONCAMIN).

== IMEF-EY International Award ==
In 1984 the IMEF research foundation awarded the first prize for the IMEF-EY International Award, with the objective to promote and encourage research on topics of interest to the macro-financial environment, as well as business and public finance in Mexico and Latin America. In 2003 the IMEF joined Deloitte to increase the spread of this contest.
