= International Association of Financial Executives Institutes =

IAFEI
- Industry: Professional association for finance executives
- Founded: 1969
- Website: https://www.iafei.org

The International Association of Financial Executives Institutes (IAFEI) is the premier global society of financial executives. Founded in 1969, it connects financial executives around the world with a global membership of more than 15,000 senior level finance executives, mainly chief financial officers across 18 national institutes. It is an international, non-profit and non-political professional association domiciled in Switzerland with its secretariat in the Philippines (Makati).

== Aims ==
IAFEI promotes networking opportunities for member institutes and their individual members, to build a wider understanding of financial practices throughout the world and the furtherance of their international compatibility and evolution, and the promotion of ethical considerations and best practices of financial management throughout the world.

IAFEI works to advance the finance profession through the activities of its technical working committees, through hosting and partnering with global, regional and national conferences, and through a number of expert publications including the IAFEI Quarterly, a digital journal of record.

The IAFEI World Congress is held annually since 1969. The congresses rotate among continents each year and are organized by the responsible national member institute on behalf of IAFEI. The 43rd IAFEI World Congress was held in conjunction with the 6th CFO Summit Emerging Europe & CIS in October 2013 in Warsaw. The 44th IAFEI World Congress was to be held in October 2014 in Manila, hosted by the Financial Executives Institute of the Philippines (FINEX).

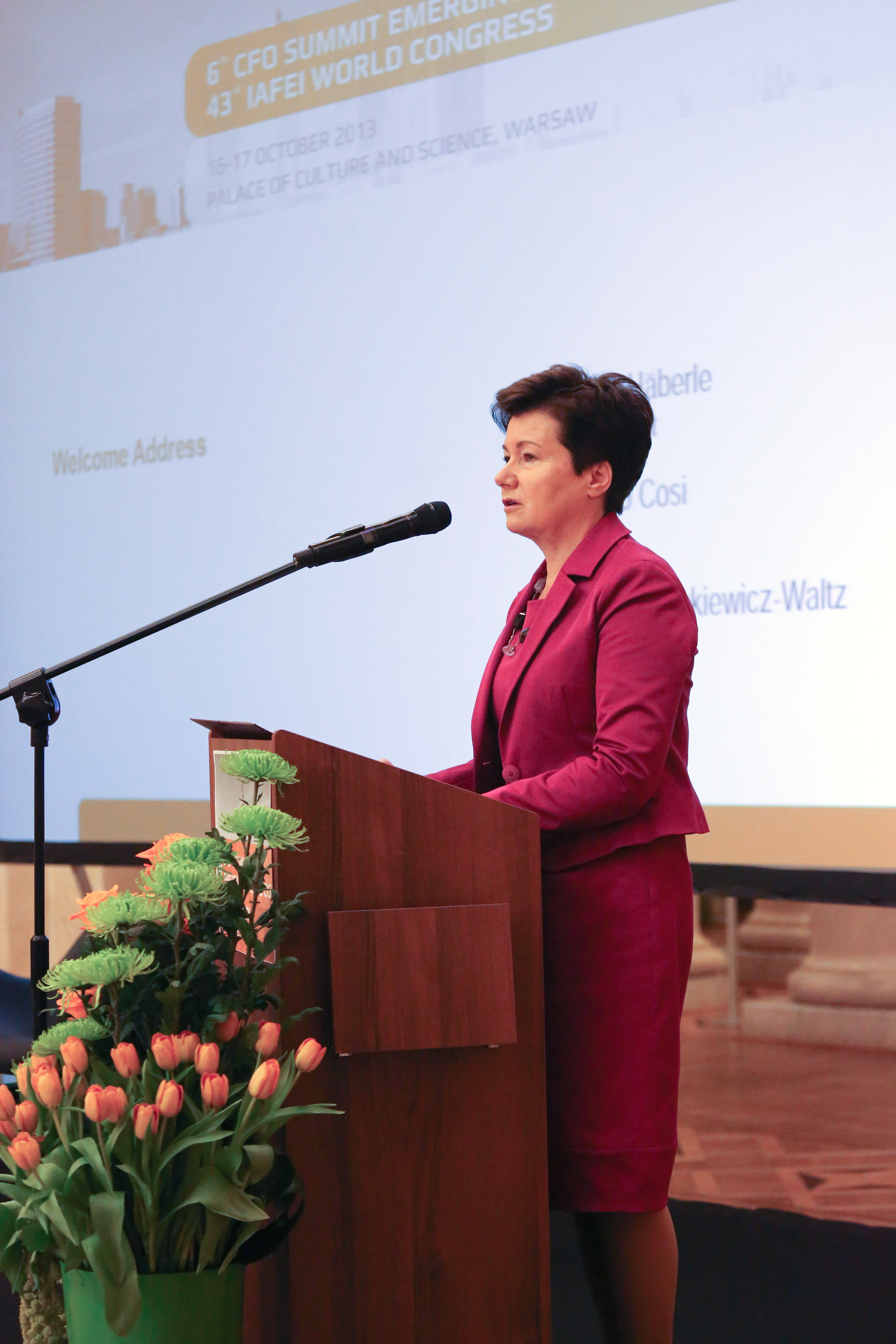
Welcome note at the 43rd IAFEI World Congress by Warsaw mayor Hanna Gronkiewicz-Waltz, former Chairman of the National Bank of Poland

== Member institutes ==
- ÖPWZ Forum Finanzen, Austria
- Financial Executives Institute of Belgium (FEIB), Belgium
- China Association of Chief Financial Officers (CACFO), China
- Financial Executives Institute of Chinese Taiwan (FEI Chinese Taiwan), Taiwan
- Association Nationale des Directeurs Financiers et de Contrôle de Gestion (DFCG), France
- Gesellschaft für Finanzwirtschaft in der Unternehmensführung e.V. (GEFIU), Germany
- Hellenic Institute of Financial Management of the Hellenic Management Association (HIFM), Greece
- Indonesia Financial Executive Association (IFEA), Indonesia
- Israel Chief Financial Officers Forum, Israel
- Associazione Nazionale Direttori Amministrativi e Finanziari (ANDAF), Italy
- Japan Association for Chief Financial Officers (JACFO), Japan
- Korea Association for Chief Financial Officers (KCFO), South Korea
- Instituto Mexicano de Ejecutivos de Finanzas (IMEF), Mexico
- Financial Executives Institute of the Philippines (FINEX), Philippines
- FINEXA - Stowarzyszenie Dyrektorów Finansowych, Poland
- All-Russian Club of Financial Directors, Russia
- Asociación Espanola de Ejecutivos de Finanzas (AEEF), Spain
- Vietnam Chief Financial Officers Club (VCFO), Vietnam

== Collaborative partnerships ==
- Financial Executives International (FEI), USA
- Financial Executives International Canada (FEI), Canada

== Members ==
Members of IAFEI national institutes are mainly executives engaged in roles of financial policy making and control in leading businesses. They share a common interest in the techniques of financial management, financial accounting, reporting and maintaining business enterprises on a healthy basis in the face of changing business conditions. Membership of national institutes is typically open to financial executives or those performing policy setting functions in large and medium size companies, depending upon the national context and local institute bylaws. In many, but not all institutes, members may also include professionals and experts working in allied fields, such as audit and advisory services firms, financial services organizations, and scholars and academics.

== IAFEI Technical Working Committees ==
IAFEI's Technical Working Committees are composed of experts around the world engaged in sharing technical knowledge in key domains of interest to senior financial professionals. Among the global committees are:

- International Observatory of Management Control
- International Tax Committee
- International Treasury Committee
- IFRS Committee

== IAFEI officers and executive committee ==
- Chairman: Luis Ortiz-Hidalgo (IMEF-Mexico)
- Vice Chairman: Fausto Cosi (ANDAF-Italy)
- Secretary: Victor Y. Lim Jr. (FINEX-Philippines)
- Treasurer: Emilio Pagani (ANDAF-Italy)
- Area President for the Americas: Juan Alfredo Ortega (IMEF-Mexico)
- Area President for Asia: Kenichi Ohta (JACFO-Japan)
- Area President Europe, Middle East & Africa: Armand Angeli (DFCG-France)
- Executive Director: Helmut Schnabel (GEFIU-Germany)

== History ==
The First International Congress of Financial Executives took place 1969 in Marbella, Spain and was hosted by the Spanish institute for finance executives (AEEF). At this event a new head organization for national institutes was created, with a legal situs in Switzerland. At the second world congress (Brussels in 1970), 55 representatives of 15 member institutes finalized the creation of the association. IAFEI was founded by the financial executives institutes of Argentina, Australia, Belgium, France, Germany, Italy, Mexico, Peru, Philippines, Spain, United Kingdom and the combined institutes of the United States of America and Canada (today: FEI - Financial Executives International), which played a key role.

== IAFEI World Congress ==
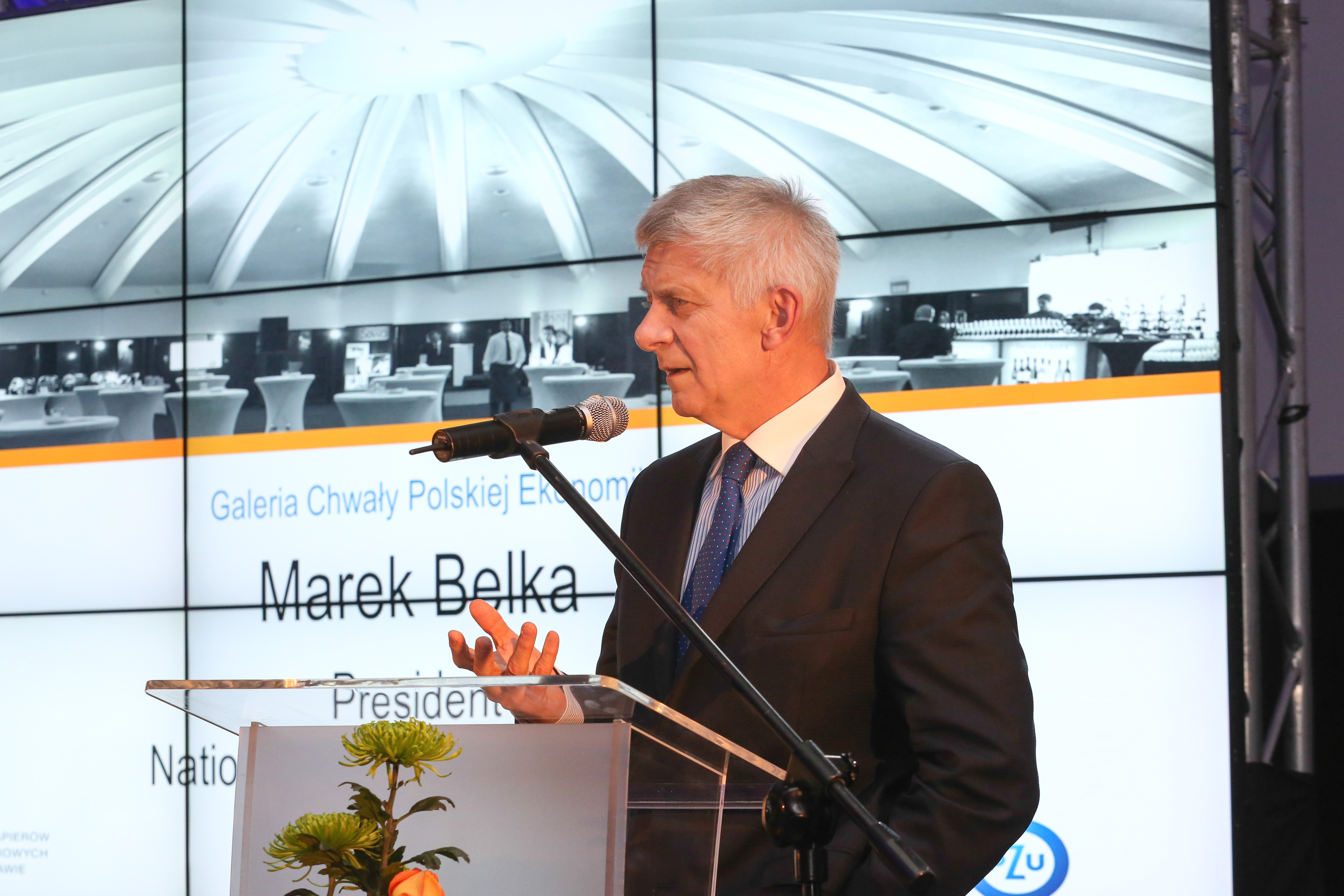
Marek Belka, president of the Polish National Bank at the gala dinner at the 43rd IAFEI World Congress in Warsaw, October 2013

The IAFEI World Congress is an annual congress organized on behalf of the IAFEI. The two to four day congress, which includes a gala dinner, is hosted by one of IAFEI's national member institutes. The congress, which is organized for corporate finance executives from all over the world, is normally held with the national convention of the hosting institute.

The first congress of international finance executives institutes was held in 1969 in Marbella, Spain. IAFEI World Congresses have since been held in 21 different countries. In the years 1975 and 2009, no congresses were organized.

Past congresses

- 1st IAFEI World Congress, Marbella, Spain, 1969
- 2nd IAFEI World Congress, Brussels, Belgium, 1970
- 3rd IAFEI World Congress, Mexico City, Mexico, 1971
- 4th IAFEI World Congress, Frankfurt am Main, Germany, 1972
- 5th IAFEI World Congress, Paris, France, 1973
- 6th IAFEI World Congress, Manila, Philippines, 1974
- 7th IAFEI World Congress, Rio de Janeiro, Brazil, 1976
- 8th IAFEI World Congress, Dublin, Ireland, 1977
- 9th IAFEI World Congress, Buenos Aires, Argentina, 1978
- 10th IAFEI World Congress, Atlanta, USA, 1979
- 11th IAFEI World Congress, Sydney, Australia, 1980
- 12th IAFEI World Congress, Mexico City, Mexico, 1981
- 13th IAFEI World Congress, Madrid, Spain, 17–20 October 1982
- 14th IAFEI World Congress, Jakarta, Indonesia, 31 October–November 2, 1983
- 15th IAFEI World Congress, Venice, Italy, 30 September-3 October 1984
- 16th IAFEI World Congress, Buenos Aires, Argentina, 17–20 November 1985
- 17th IAFEI World Congress, Hong Kong, Hong Kong, 9–12 November 1986
- 18th IAFEI World Congress, Caracas, Venezuela, 25–28 October 1987
- 19th IAFEI World Congress, Manila, Philippines, 16–19 October 1988
- 20th IAFEI World Congress, Paris, France, 26–29 September 1989
- 21st IAFEI World Congress, Taipei, Taiwan, 5–7 November 1990
- 22nd IAFEI World Congress, Cancun, Mexico, 21–23 November 1991
- 23rd IAFEI World Congress, Madrid, Spain, 25–28 October 1992
- 24th IAFEI World Congress, San Carlos de Bariloche, Argentina, 19–25 September 1993
- 25th IAFEI World Congress, Washington D.C., USA, 2–5 October 1994
- 26th IAFEI World Congress, Rome, Italy, 4–6 October 1995
- 27th IAFEI World Congress, Jakarta/Bali, Indonesia, 30 October-1 November 1996
- 28th IAFEI World Congress, Interlaken, Switzerland, 18–19 September 1997
- 29th IAFEI World Congress, Rio de Janeiro, Brazil, 20–23 September 1998
- 30th IAFEI World Congress, Vancouver, B.C., Canada, 26–28 May 1999
- 31st IAFEI World Congress, Sydney, Australia, 8–11 October 2000
- 32nd IAFEI World Congress, Cancun, Mexico, 17–21 October 2001
- 33rd IAFEI World Congress, Madrid, Spain, 23–25 October 2002
- 34th IAFEI World Congress, Florida, USA, 4–7 May 2003
- 35th IAFEI World Congress, Florence, Italy, 11–13 October 2004
- 36th IAFEI World Congress, Manila, Philippines, 4–7 November 2005
- 37th IAFEI World Congress, Berlin, Germany, 8–11 October 2006
- 38th IAFEI World Congress, Tokyo, Japan, 10–12 September 2007
- 39th IAFEI World Congress, Paris, France, 15–17 December 2008
- 40th IAFEI World Congress, Rome, Italy, 13–15 October 2010
- 41st IAFEI World Congress, Beijing, China, 16–18 September 2011
- 42nd IAFEI World Congress, Cancun, Mexico, 14–17 November 2012
- 43rd IAFEI World Congress was held in conjunction with 6th CFO Summit Emerging Markets & CIS in Warsaw, Poland from 14–17 October 2013. The organizers on behalf of IAFEI were FINEXA - Stowarzyszenie Dyrektorów Finansowych and CFO Insight (a media brand by Frankfurt Business Media, Frankfurt).
- 44th IAFEI World Congress, 15–17 October 2014 for the fourth time in Manila, Philippines. This was organized by the Financial Executives Institute of the Philippines (FINEX).
