= Adam Maciejewski =

Polish economist and manager (born 1962)

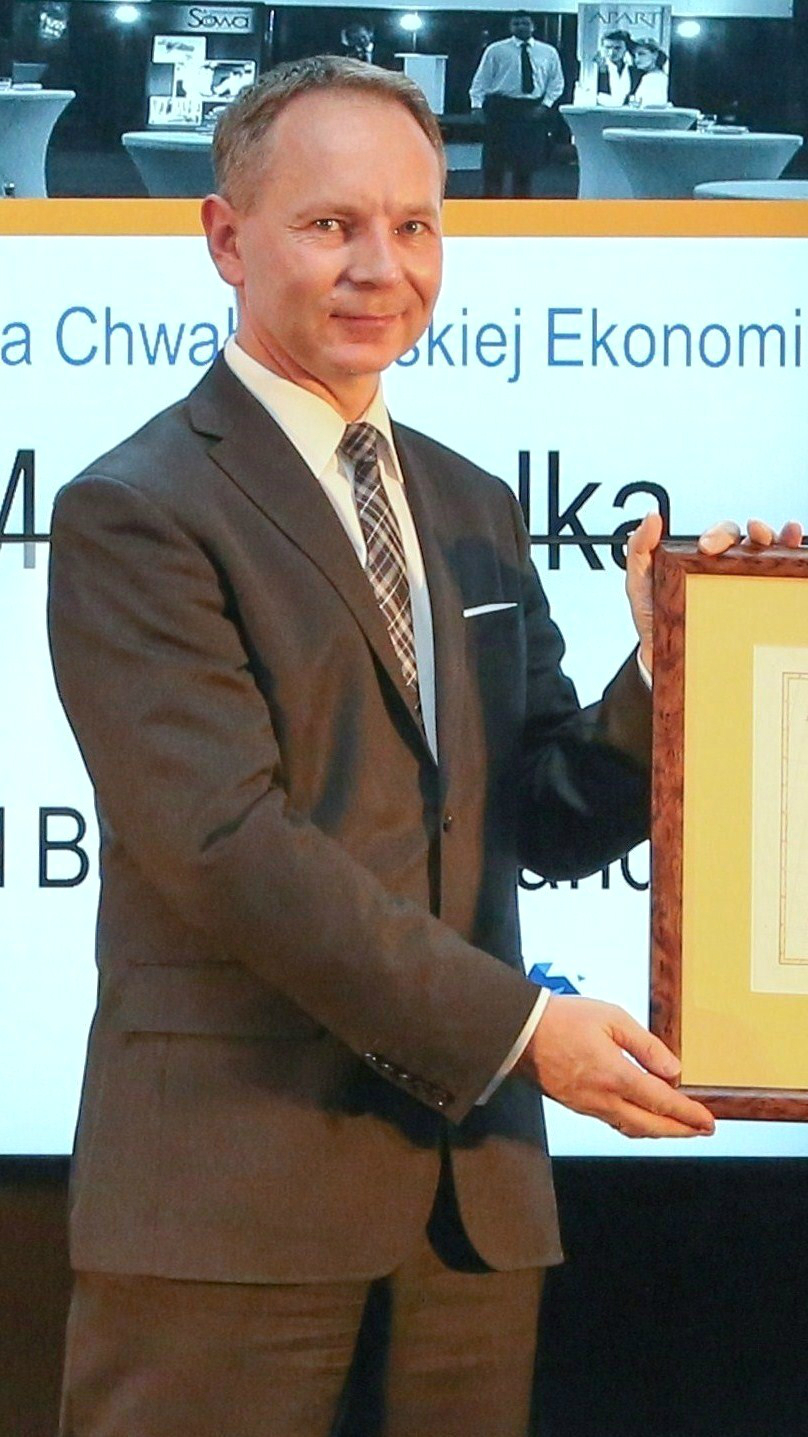
Adam Maciejewski

Adam Maciejewski (born 31 January 1967 in Pruszków) is a Polish economist and manager. He is the president of the management board of the Warsaw Stock Exchange.

== Biography ==
Maciejewski graduated from Warsaw School of Economics. He has been authorised to represent the Polish State Treasury on supervisory boards.

Since 1994, he has worked for the Warsaw Stock Exchange in several management functions. Since 28 June 2006 he has been a member of the management board. On behalf of WSE, he has been the main negotiator of the strategic agreements with NYSE Euronext. On 17 January 2013 he was appointed as the President of the management board. In addition, he serves as the chairman of the supervisory board of the Polish Power Exchange and chairman of the supervisory board of BondSpot. Maciejewski is a jury member at the Galeria Chwały Polskiej Ekonomii.
