= Alicja Kornasiewicz =

Polish economist, manager and politician

- Born: Alicja Józefa Kornasiewicz; 19 March 1951 (age 75); Kańczuga, Poland
- Education: Warsaw School of Economics; Poznań University of Economics
- Title: Chair, Cineworld
- Term: May 2020-

Alicja Józefa Kornasiewicz (born 18 March 1951 in Kańczuga) is a Polish economist, manager and politician. She was a member of Polish parliament and served as Secretary of State and Vice Minister at the Ministry of State Treasury in Poland. She is a managing director of the Warsaw office of Morgan Stanley and chair of Cineworld.

== Education ==
Kornasiewicz studied at Szkoła Główna Planowania i Statystyki. She received a PhD degree from Poznań University of Economics.

In 1978, she passed exams as Statutory auditor; she is a member of the National Chamber of Statutory Auditors in Poland. She attended the six-week Advanced Management Programme at Harvard Business School and the Executive and Advanced Management Programme at INSEAD.

== Career ==
At the first free elections after the democratic transition in Poland, Kornasiewicz became a member of parliament from 1989 to 1991, representing the Polish People's Party (election district of Płock). In the government of Jerzy Buzek, she served as Secretary of State in the Polish Ministry of the Treasury from 1997 to 2000.

Prior to that she worked for the European Bank for Reconstruction and Development (EBRD) as a senior banker in London. Kornasiewicz was head of emerging European countries investment banking at Unicredit Group and a member of the executive committee at the bank's Markets & Investment Banking Division. From 2010, she was President of the Management Board of Polish Bank Pekao SA.

In January 2012, Kornasiewicz joined Morgan Stanley as a senior adviser in investment banking covering Poland and Central and Eastern Europe (CEE). She is a managing director of the Warsaw office of the firm. Kornasiewicz is a jury member at Galeria Chwały Polskiej Ekonomii.

In May 2020, Kornasiewicz became chair of Cineworld, having been a non-executive director since May 2015.
