= Wiesław Rozłucki =

Polish economist

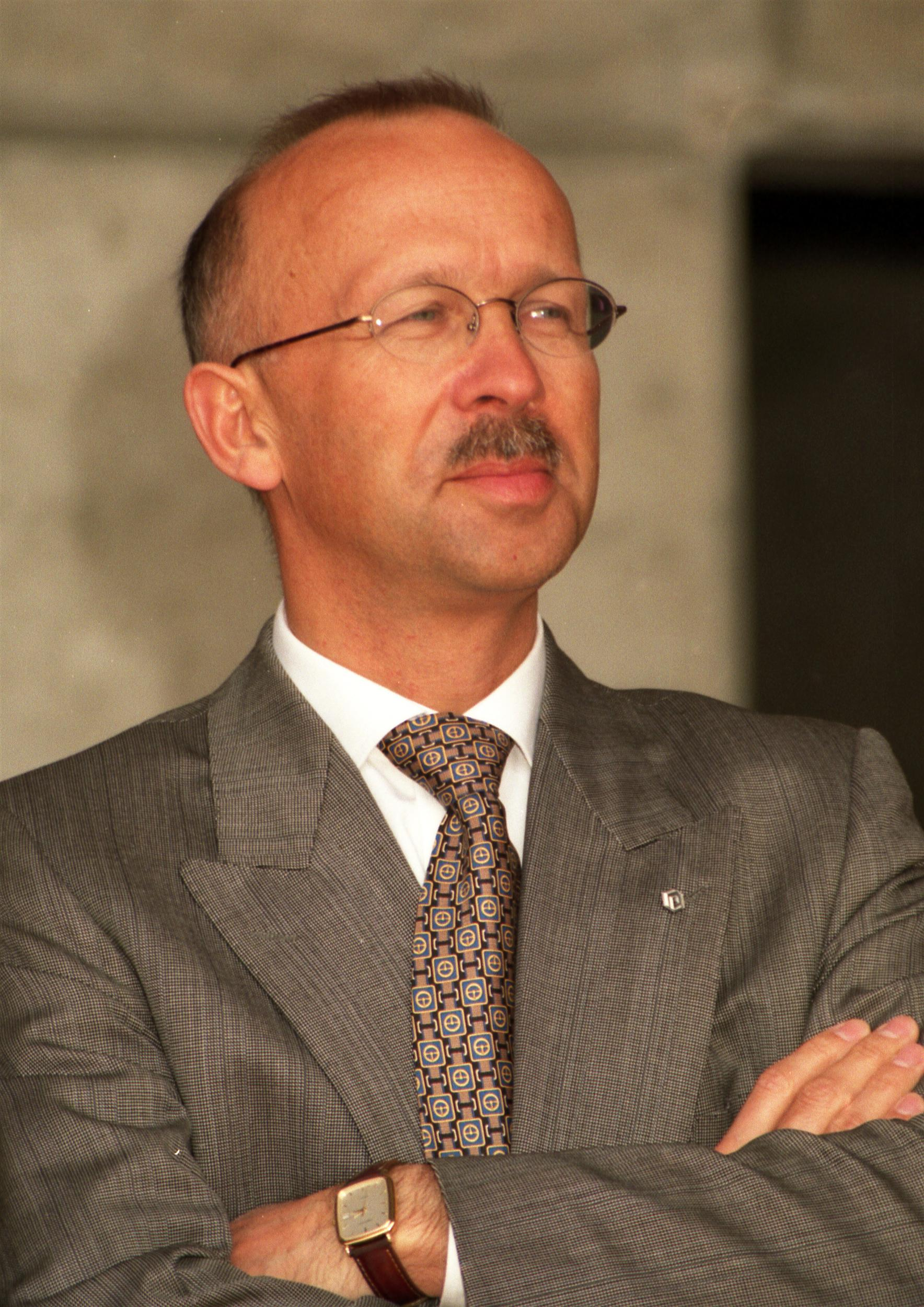
- Wiesław Rozłucki in 1999
- Born: December 9, 1947 (age 78); Gliwice, Poland
- Education: Szkoła Główna Planowania i Statystyki (1970)
- Occupation: Economist
- Title: Chairman of the Warsaw Stock Exchange
- Term: 1991–2006

Wiesław Rozłucki (born 1947) is a Polish economist, co-founder of the Warsaw Stock Exchange and its first chairman (1991–2006). Since 1990 occupied various advisory positions to Polish government and various supervisory positions in public companies, foundations and organizations.

== Awards and recognition ==
- 1995:National Order of Merit (France)
- 2000: Commander's Cross of the Order of Polonia Restituta
- 2007: interred into the Polish Economy Hall of Fame
- 2011: Commander's Cross wits Star of the Order of Polonia Restituta
