= Warshaw =

Warshaw is a surname. Notable people with the surname include:

- Bobby Warshaw (born 1988), American soccer player
- Dalit Warshaw (born 1974), American composer and pianist
- Howard Scott Warshaw (born 1957), American psychotherapist and game designer
- Jack Warshaw (born 1942), American folksinger
- Matt Warshaw (born 1960), American surfer
- Robert Warshaw, American law enforcement official
- Dave Warshaw (born 1973), Tattoo artist, illustrator, musician
- John Warshaw (born 1964) Founder of Santa Cruz Telephone

== See also ==
- Warsaw
