= Financial Executives International =

Financial Executives International (FEI) is a member-service–oriented organization based in Morristown, New Jersey, for senior-level financial at companies of all types. FEI operates a separate nonprofit foundation: Financial Education & Research Foundation (FERF), which acts as an impartial financial resource for members and Foundation supporters.

== History ==
FEI was founded as the Controllers Institute of America in 1931. The organization renamed itself in 1962 to Financial Executives Institute to reflect the expansion of responsibilities among financial executives into policy-making areas. As the global economy continued to grow in the 1960s, the group helped form the International Association of Financial Executives Institutes (IAFEI). By 2000, the organization had opened membership to financial executives from around the world and underwent another name change – Financial Executives International. In 2011, FEI had 86 chapters in cities across the United States and Canada as well as Japan. Some of the organization's largest chapters are located in Boston, Los Angeles, Silicon Valley, New York City, Dallas and Chicago. FEI launched a Japan Chapter in February 2012, marking the organization's first expansion outside of North America. FEI is headquartered in Morristown, New Jersey, with offices in Washington, D.C. FEI Canada, which operates independently, has 11 chapters and is headquartered in Toronto, Ontario.

In 1944, FEI created a separate foundation, FERF, which performs impartial and independent research on financial and strategic management topics for a wide breadth of industries. FEI Canada's research foundation is called CFERF (the Canadian Financial Executives Research Foundation).

== Financial Education & Research Foundation ==
The Financial Education & Research Foundation (FERF) was founded in 1944 as a separate 501(c)(3) nonprofit educational organization. It was established in order to provide financial solutions for the financial management profession through impartial and independent research. It frequently partners with other organizations to conduct industry research.

== Research ==
- FERF partnered with Robert Half Management Resources on its third annual report surveying financial executives on a global scale, including 25 percent of respondents residing in Canada and 11 percent residing in France. Key findings included: 38 percent of US companies outsourced payroll functions, 11 percent of US companies used IFRS accounting standards, and 49 percent of US respondents believed financial reforms resulting from the 2008 financial crisis are adding to the cost of compliance.
- XBRL serves as a freely available, open and global standard for exchanging business information. XBRL used FERF as an impartial researching arm to survey more than 300 public companies on their XBRL experiences.
- KPMG has three lines of services, including audit, tax and advisory. The organization partners with FERF to conduct studies on financial services. Recent studies show that investors and financial executives are feeling overloaded by the volume and complexity of financial disclosure information in annual reports and other financial filings.
- Grant Thornton International is a global professional services network of independent accounting and consulting member firms. Grant Thornton partnered with FERF to examine company methods being utilized to raise capital.
- Gartner, an information technology research and advisory firm, partnered with FERF to conduct impartial research studies to deduce strategic solutions. One such survey conducted among Chief Financial Officers (CFO) found that only five percent of CIOs can authorize IT investments. This study served to gather financial executives' perceptions of technology and key trends for improvement within the business sector.

== Partnerships ==
- Research conducted using a 2012 survey of European and American Chief Financial Officers (CFOs) found confidence in the global economy is on the rise. However, domestic growth is among the top concerns of both American and European CFOs.
- The Center for Audit Quality partnered with the Institute of Internal Auditors and the National Association of Corporate Directors along with FEI to develop fraud-fighting training tools.
- The Committee of Sponsoring Organizations of the Treadway Commission (COSO) is organized to sponsor the National Commission of Fraudulent Financial Reporting. COSO works to provide guidance on enterprise risk management (ERM), internal control and fraud deterrence designed to improve organization performance and governance and reduce fraud in organizations. COSO is supported by five organizations, including the Institute of Management Accountants (IMA), the American Accounting Association (AAA), the American Institute of Certified Public Accountants (AICPA), the Institute of Internal Auditors (IIA) and FEI.
