= Forum Mleczarskie =

Polish business magazine

Forum Mleczarskie Handel
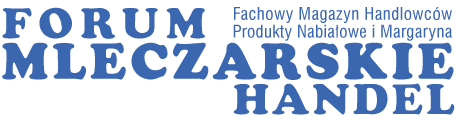
- Editor-in-chief: Janusz Górski
- Former editors: Karol Krajewski
- Staff writers: Monika Kuleta; Robert Zawadzki
- Categories: Trade magazine
- Frequency: Bi-monthly
- Circulation: 8,000
- Publisher: Nathusius Investments
- Founded: 2003
- Country: Poland
- Based in: Warsaw
- Language: Polish
- Website: www.forummleczarskie.pl
- ISSN: 1899-4997

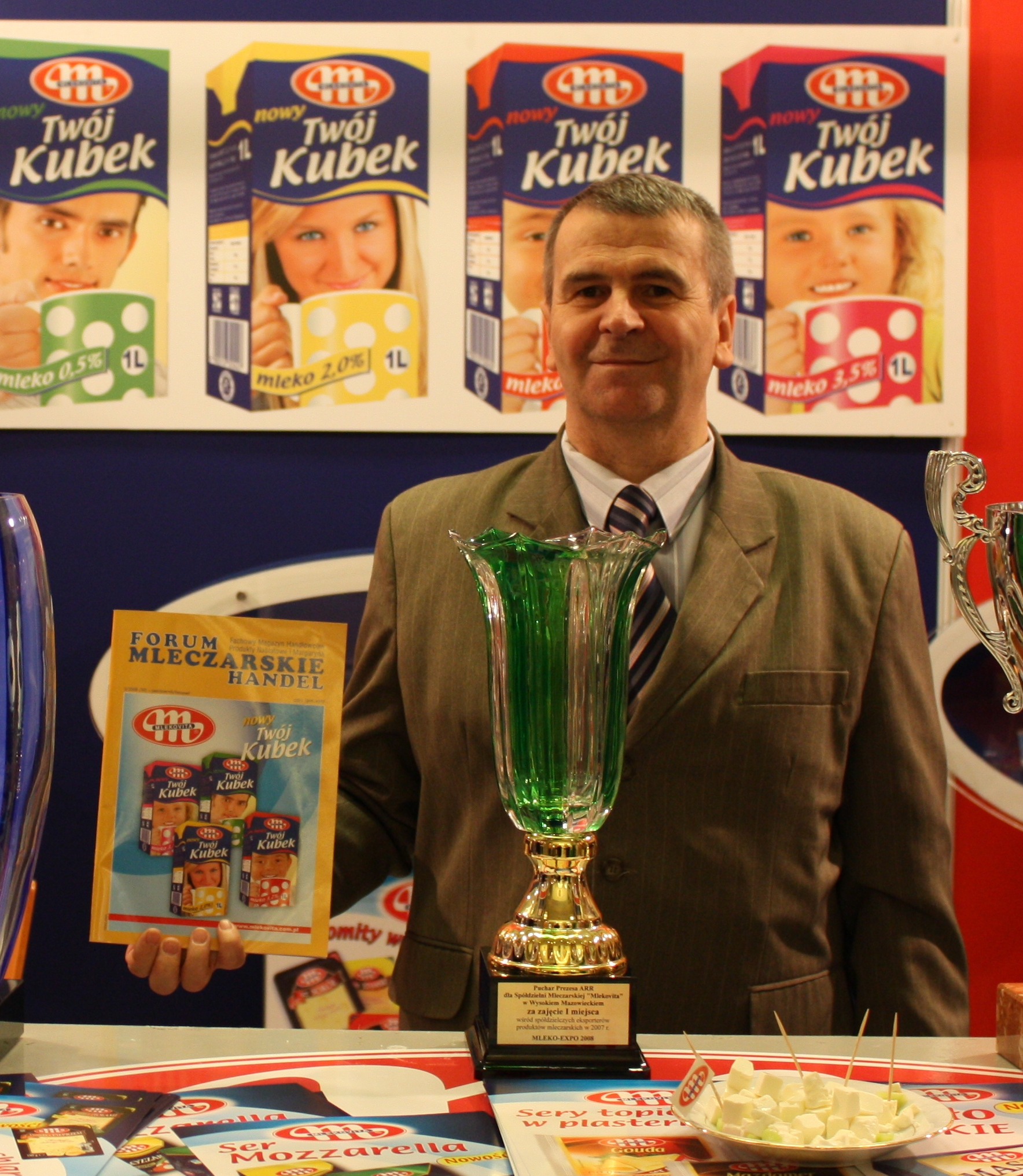
CEO of the Mlekovita holding (Wysokie Mazowieckie), Dariusz Sapiński receiving the Lider Forum award at trade show Mleko-Expo in Warsaw, 13 November 2008.

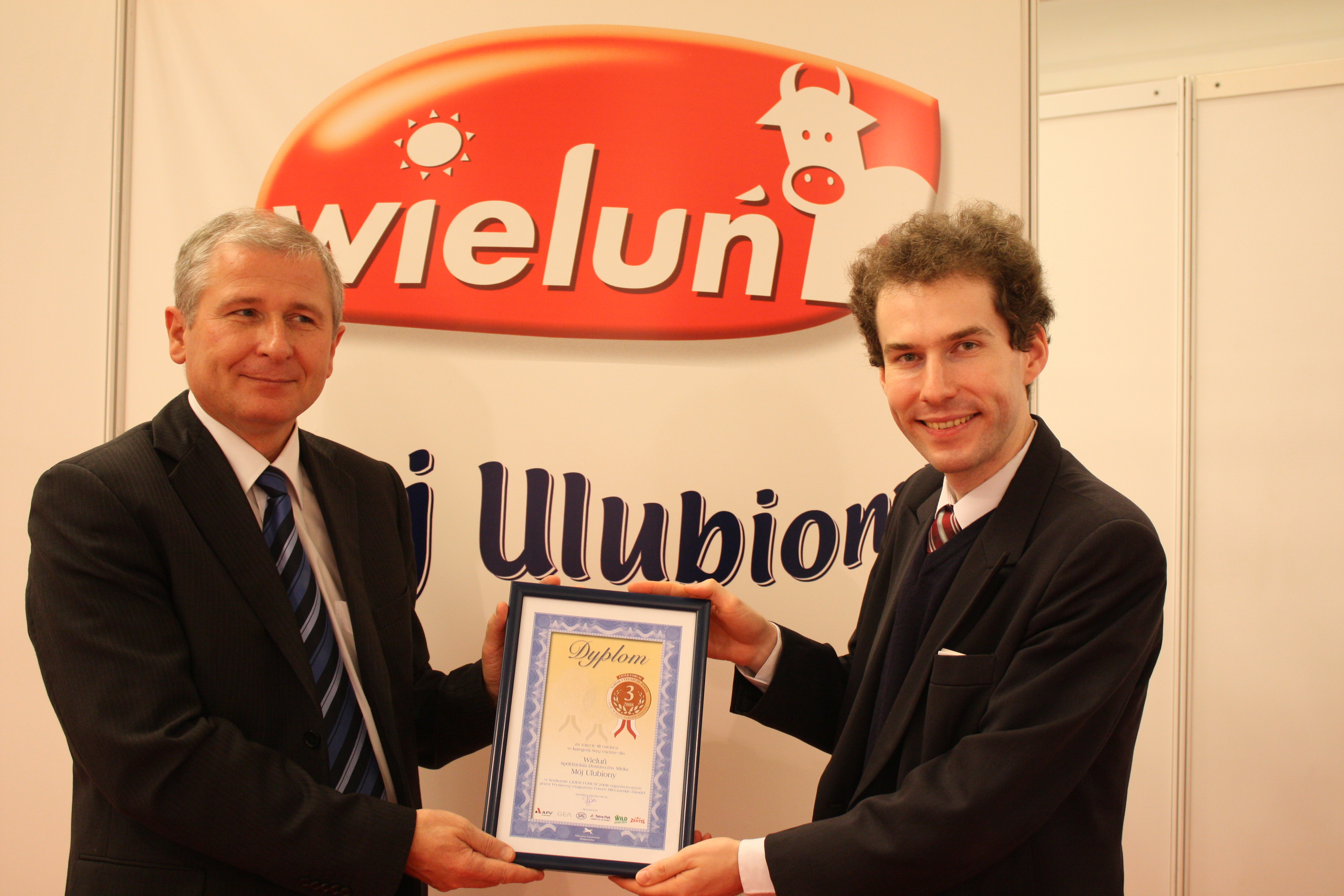
Vice CEO of the dairy cooperative (Spółdzielni Dostawców Mleka) from Wielun, Bogdan Woźniak receives the Lider Forum 2008 certificate from Janusz Górski, editor-in-chief of Forum Mleczarskie Handel.

The bi-monthly Forum Mleczarskie Handel is the oldest Polish business magazine about the dairy products trade. The title was the forerunner of a new kind of trade magazines focusing on category managers (purchasers and sellers) in the modern fast-moving consumer goods (FMCG) wholesale and retail trade in Poland. The title is quoted frequently by other Polish media.

== Idea ==
The title was developed as a reaction of the rapidly changing FMCG trade sector in Poland since 1995. Tens of thousands of former small FMCG shops have been replaced by modern retail chains, which has been followed by a change of professions in this industry: instead of generalists, specialists now rule the day. Such professions – new for Poland – created a demand for business information sources for the FMCG category. Readers of Forum Mleczarskie Handel are buyers and sales managers (dairy or fresh products) in headquarters and outlets of wholesale and retail chains like Auchan, Biedronka, Carrefour, E.Leclerc, Lidl, MarcPol, Makro Cash and Carry, Netto, Real, Tesco and others.

== Main editors ==
First editor-in-chief of the title was Karol Krajewski, a junior professor at Gdynia Maritime University (Akademia Morska w Gdyni), later head of the consulting department to the Ministry of Agriculture and Rural Development (Ministerstwo Rolnictwa i Rozwoju Wsi). Since January 2006 Janusz Górski runs the editorial team of all Forum Mleczarskie-titles. The editorial advisory board actually has two members: Antoni Pluta, director of the biotechnology department of the Warsaw University of Life Science (Szkoła Główna Gospodarstwa Wiejskiego w Warszawie) and Maria Andrzej Faliński, president of the Polish trade organization POHID.

== Partners ==
=== Co-operating organizations ===
- National Association of Dairy Cooperatives (Krajowy Związek Spółdzielni Mleczarskich Związek Rewizyjny)
- National Association of Dairy Producers (Krajowe Stowarzyszenie Mleczarzy)
- Union of Private Dairy Producers (Związek Prywatnych Przetwórców Mleka)
- Polish Trade and Distribution Organization (Polska Organizacja Handlu i Dystrybucji)
- The Polish Employers Association Lewiatan (Polska Konfederacja Pracodawców Prywatnych Lewiatan), which publishes material from Forum Mleczarskie

=== Editorial co-operation partners ===
- University of Warmia and Mazury in Olsztyn (Uniwersytet Warmińsko-Mazurski w Olsztynie)
- Warsaw University of Life Science (Szkoła Główna Gospodarstwa Wiejskiego w Warszawie)
- University of Life Sciences in Poznań (Uniwersytet Przyrodniczy w Poznaniu)

=== Partners in market research ===
- Nielsen Polska
- MEMRB
- Sparks Polska

=== Event participation ===
- Mleko-Expo
- Poznań International Fair "Polagra-Food"
- Trade show Mlecznia Rewia in Gdańsk (Targi Mleczarstwa Mleczna Rewia)
- The National Milk Price Estimation (Krajowa Ocena Masła i Mlecznych Nowości Rynkowych)
- Conference about dairy production technology in Mrągowo (Sympozjum Technika i Technologia w Przemyśle Mleczarskim w Mrągowie)
- The Dairy Cooperatives Forum (Forum Spółdzielczości Mleczarskiej)

=== Patronage ===
- campaign Stawiam na mleko (I believe in milk)
- campaign Pij mleko! Będziesz wielki (Drink milk! You will be strong)
- trade show Mleko-Expo

== Awards ==
- Lider Forum. In 2005 Forum Mleczarskie Handel established a product award in the Polish dairy trade. The aim of the award is to present the best products currently on sale, based on research of readers of the title. Subjects may choose from 15 different categories the top three products, out of a range nominated by the editorial team. The award is well-known and many winning producers use the logo to promote their products.
- Top Kupiec (engl.: Top Buyer). Dedicated to the most professional and successful acting fresh food purchasers in Polands FMCG-wholesale- and retail-chains.
- Top Sprzedawca (engl.: Top Salesperson). Created and first time elected in 2010 by Forum Mleczarskie Praktyka. To identify and honor the best three sales-teams of a year at cheese counters in Polish super-and hypermarkets.

== Sister publications ==
- Forum Mleczarskie Biznes is a quarterly, delivering business information for dairy producers and their providers. The content focusses on product innovation, marketshare and technological development in the dairy industry.
- Forum Mleczarskie Praktyka is dedicated to specialists working at cheese-counters selling individually sized and packed cheese products to customers. The publication is published twice per year and read by both, employees at supermarkets with cheese counters and at delicatessen shops.
- Forum Mleczarskie Katalog is a yearbook/catalogue for the trade with a listing of around 1.000 currently available dairy and margarine products by approximately 300 producers and importers. The title was launched in 2005.
- Forum Mleczarskie Kto jest Kim: Top menadżerowie w polskim mleczarstwie is a Who-is-who of the Polish dairy industry. Published in 2011.
- Forum Mleczarskie Podręcznik. A yearly handbook for employees in cheese-sale, published in 2012.

== Memberships ==
- International Advertising Association, Polish Chapter (Międzynarodowe Stowarzyszenie Reklamy w Polsce)
- The Polish Publishers Association (Izba Wydawców Prasy)

== Title Covers ==
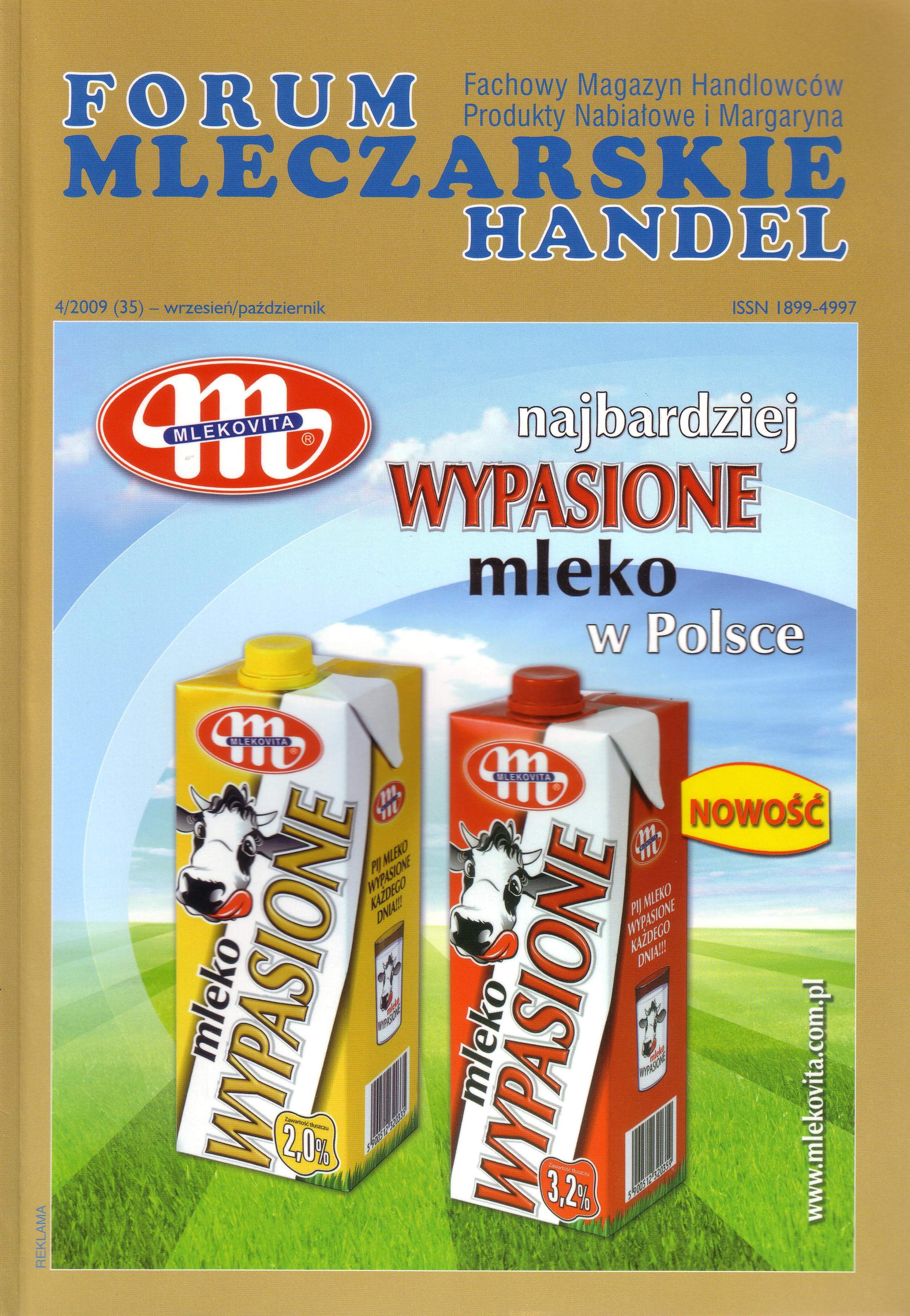
Forum Mleczarskie Handel

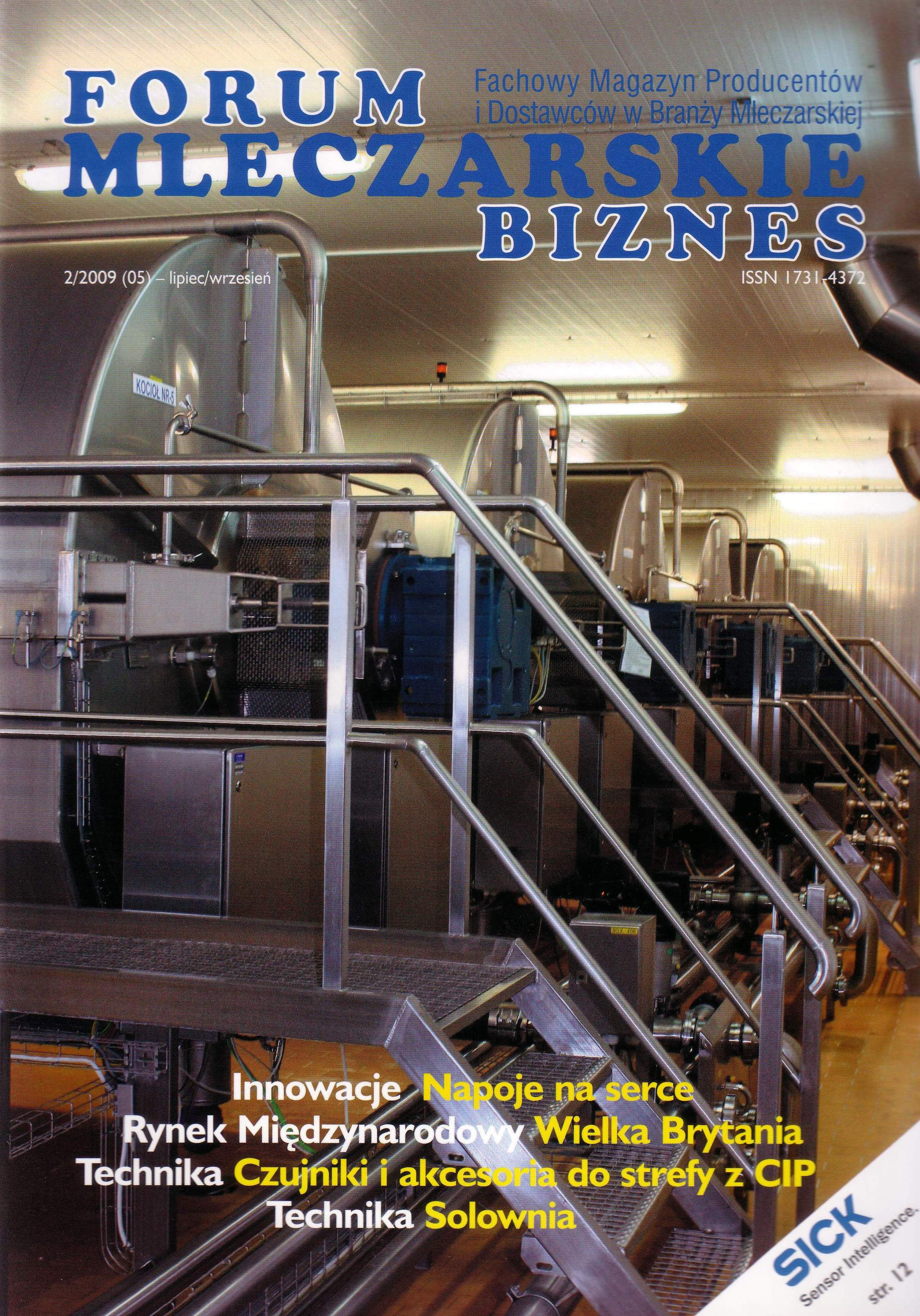
Forum Mleczarskie
Biznes

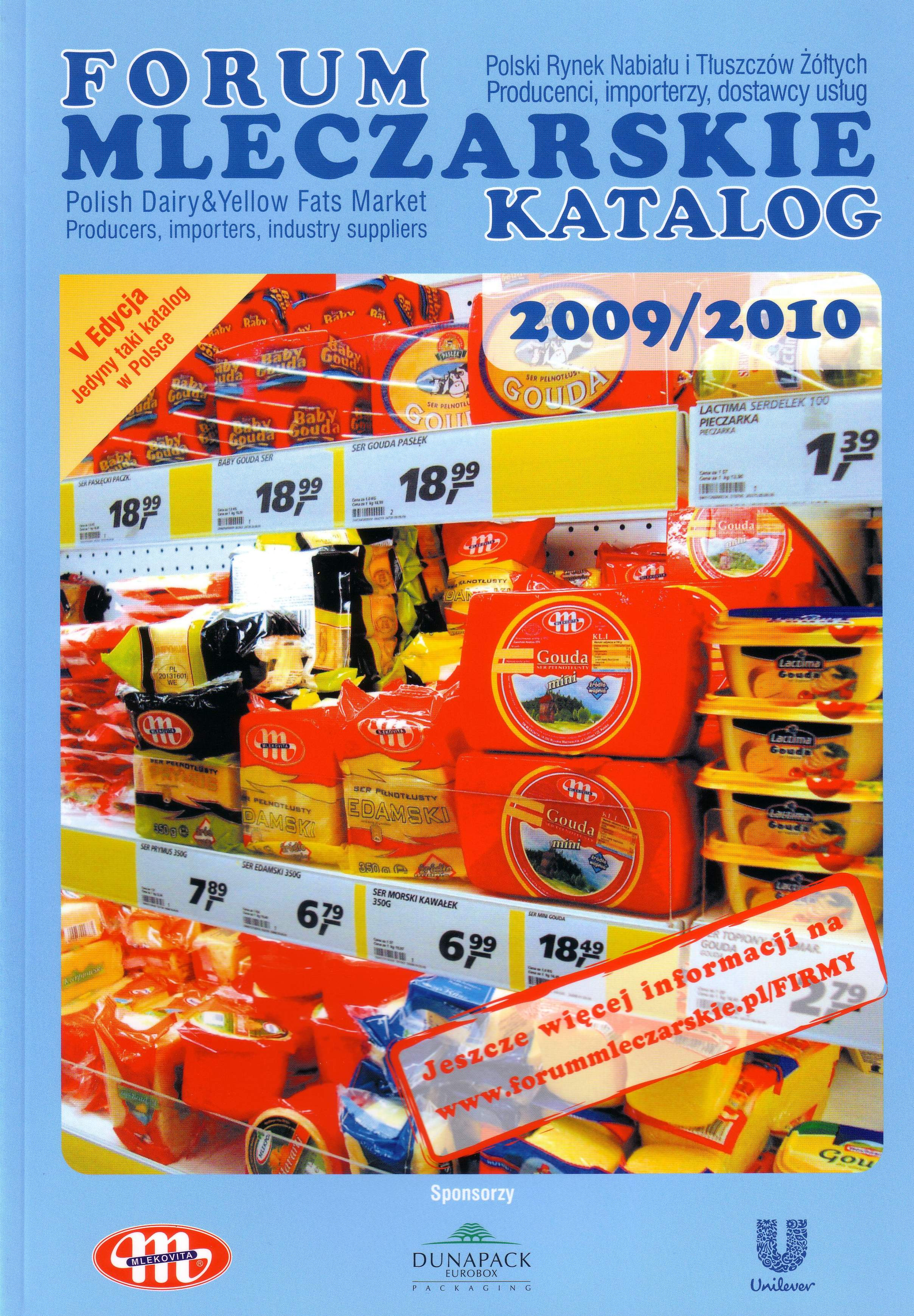
Forum Mleczarskie Katalog

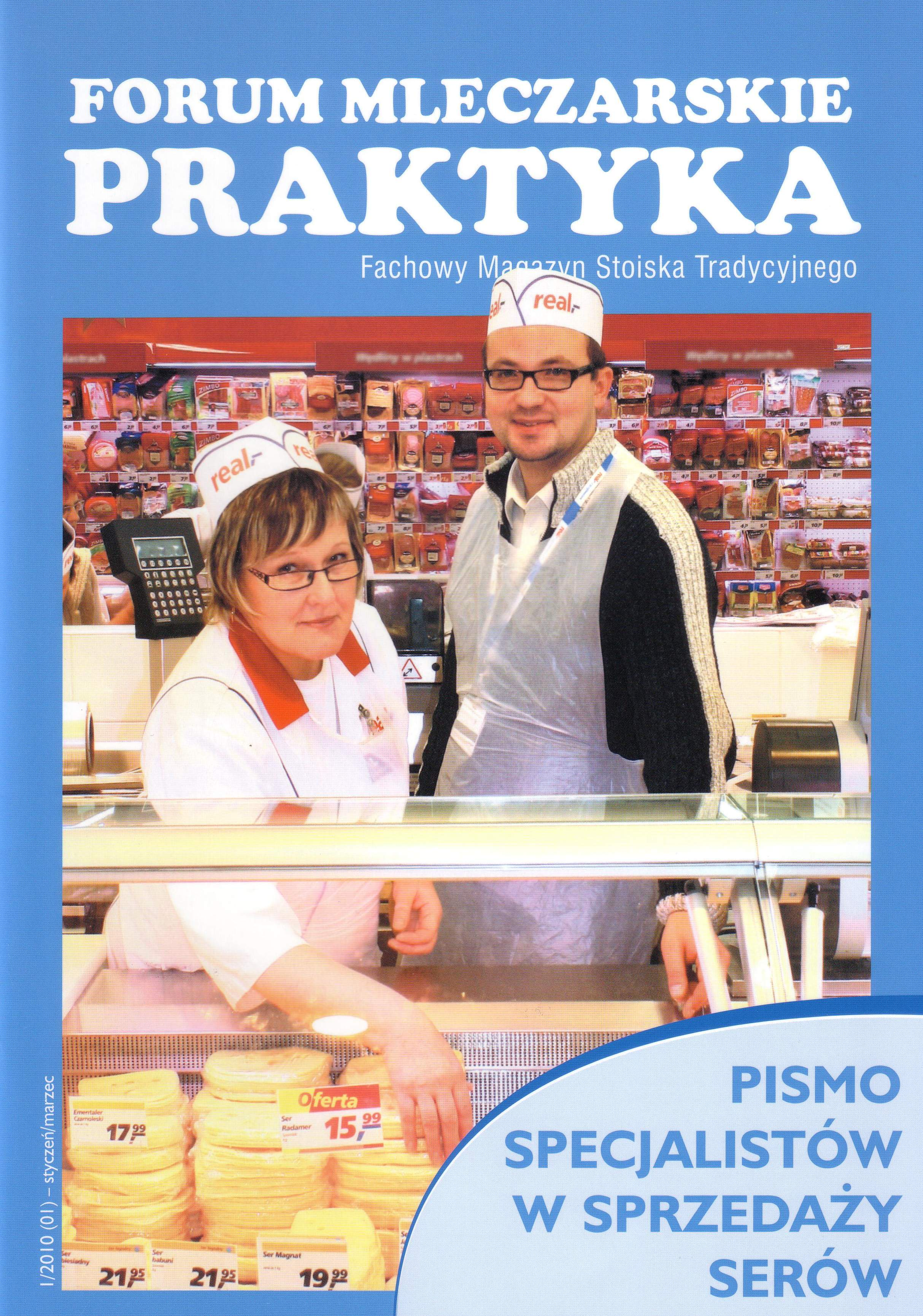
Forum Mleczarskie Praktyka

== See also ==
- List of magazines in Poland
- Dairy product
