= Adam Budnikowski =

Polish economist (born 1948)

Adam Budnikowski (born 18 November 1948 in Więcbork) is a Polish economist. He teaches at the Warsaw School of Economics and served there as a rector from 2005 to 2012. He specialises in international economies, with a focus on globalization, international trade policy and international finance. Further interests include economic transition in Central and Eastern Europe and environmental policy.

== Biography ==
Budnikowski is a graduate of Economics at the Poznań University of Economics in 1971. He received a PhD degree 1975 and the Habilitation in 1983. Since 1974 he is employed at the Warsaw School of Economics, since 1992 as professor. He was a Fulbright Program visiting scholar at the Massachusetts Institute of Technology from 1985 to 1987 and acts as visiting professor in Germany, UK, USA (University of Minnesota, Northeastern Illinois University) and Poland.

At Warsaw School of Economics Budnikowski served as Dean of the World Economy Faculty from 1996 to 2002. He is Director of the Institute of International Economics since 1998. Since 1974 the economist is affiliated with the Polish Economic Association. Budnikowski is the co-editor of the journal "Ekonomia i Środowisko" (Economics and Environment).
