= Nathusius Investments =

Nathusius Investments Sp.z o.o.
- Type: Publishing House
- Founded: 1994
- Founder: Krystyna von Nathusius, Nikolaus von Nathusius
- Headquarters: Warsaw, Poland
- Key people: Dariusz Jaroszek (COO), Urszula Jankowska (CFO)
- Products: Magazines, events
- Services: Publishing
- Website: www.nathusius.pl

Nathusius Investments Sp.z o.o. is a media investment company with a focus on diversified business-to-business (B2B) publishing and event activities based in Warsaw, Poland.

== History ==
The company was founded in 1994 (then called Tęcza Dom Wydawniczy i Handlowy) and originally focused on publishing licensed special interest magazines. Its titles included Moje Mieszkanie (Note: Today published by Murator SA) (an interior magazine based on a license by German publisher Gruner + Jahr) and Majster (a do it yourself-title licensed from German Jahreszeiten Verlag).

In 1996 Nathusius Investments started business-to-business publishing with the foundation of the subsidiary Unit Wydawnictwo Informacje Branżowe. This entity published 15 magazines, mainly directed to trade managers in the non-fast-moving consumer goods-sector. The company was sold in 2000 to Verlagsgruppe Ebner Ulm (publisher of WatchTime Magazine).

Beside publishing business magazines Nathusius Investments in 1998 involved in several internet-only businesses through its subsidiary WebMastersHome Sp. z o.o.. Public attention has been raised by the project “Salon.pl” (run by Shop Online Sp.z o.o., a company owned by WebMastersHome).

== Activities ==
Nathusius Investments established several awards, for example the Polish dairy industry award “Lider Forum”. Others are "Top Kupiec" and "Top Sprzedawca". The company is a member in the Polish Press Publishers Association (Izba Wydawców Prasy - IWP), the International Advertising Association, Polish chapter and at the Polish press auditing association ZKDP (Związek Kontroli Dystrybucji Prasy).

== Major brands ==
- Disco Magic Publishing
- Forum Mleczarskie - Media Branży Nabiałowej
- Strategie - Świat Dyrektorów Finansowych
