= Manager Magazin =

German business magazine

- Categories: Business magazine
- Frequency: Monthly
- Publisher: Manager Magazin Verlagsgesellschaft
- First issue: 1 November 1971; 53 years ago
- Country: Germany
- Based in: Hamburg
- Language: German
- Website: manager magazin
- ISSN: 0047-5726

Manager Magazin (stylized as manager magazin) is a German monthly business magazine focusing on business, finance and management based in Hamburg.

== History and profile ==
Manager Magazin was first published on 1 November 1971. It is part of the Spiegel Group which also owns Der Spiegel among others.

The magazine is based in Hamburg and is published monthly by the Manager Magazin Verlagsgesellschaft. Since 1986, Gruner + Jahr has a 24.9 percent share in the publisher of the magazine. The other owner of its publishing house is the Spiegel Group. As of 2024, Isabell Hülsen was the editor-in-chief of the monthly and its news website.

Manager Magazin has a liberal stance. The magazine targets professional decision makers and managers in Germany. It covers business news, related data and background information concerning all economic areas. The online edition of the monthly was launched in 1998.

The magazine publishes several ranking lists, including good companies and the 500 richest Germans. The former list was started in 1987.

From 2004 to 2008, the Polish edition of the magazine, Manager Magazin – Edycja Polska, was published in Poland.

The Manager Magazin publishing company also publishes Harvard Business Manager as the German licensed edition of the American Harvard Business Review.

== Circulation ==
In 2025, Manager Magazin sold 88,793 copies.

== See also ==
- List of magazines in Germany
