= Józef Kopczyński =

Polish sculptor (1930–2006)

Józef Kopczyński (17 October 1930 – 25 May 2006) was a Polish modern sculptor and medallist specialising in small sculptural forms. He was a long-standing lecturer at the Academy of Fine Arts in Poznań, where he served as a full professor and headed his atelier.

== Life and career ==
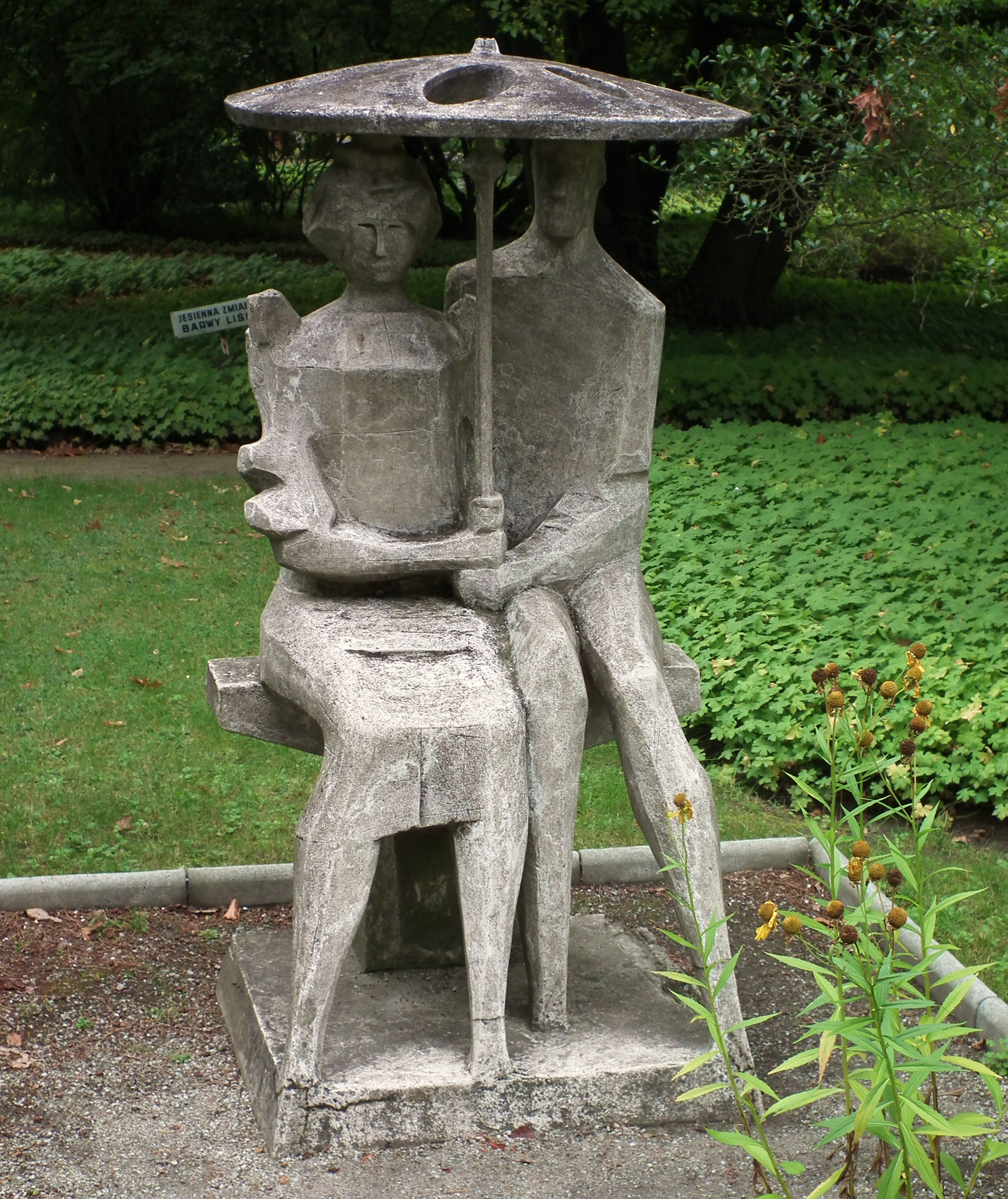
Couple under an Umbrella (1967), AMU Botanical Garden, Poznań

Kopczyński was the son of Józef Kopczyński, a merchant, and Bronisława Nyka. During World War II, his family was displaced to Nowy Targ. Kopczyński graduated from the Śniadeckich Gymnasium in Żnin before pursuing studies in sculpture at the State Higher School of Fine Arts in Poznań. He was employed as an assistant in 1955 and studied under the guidance of Jacek Puget. He received his diploma in 1956 from the atelier of Professor Bazyli Wojtowicz.

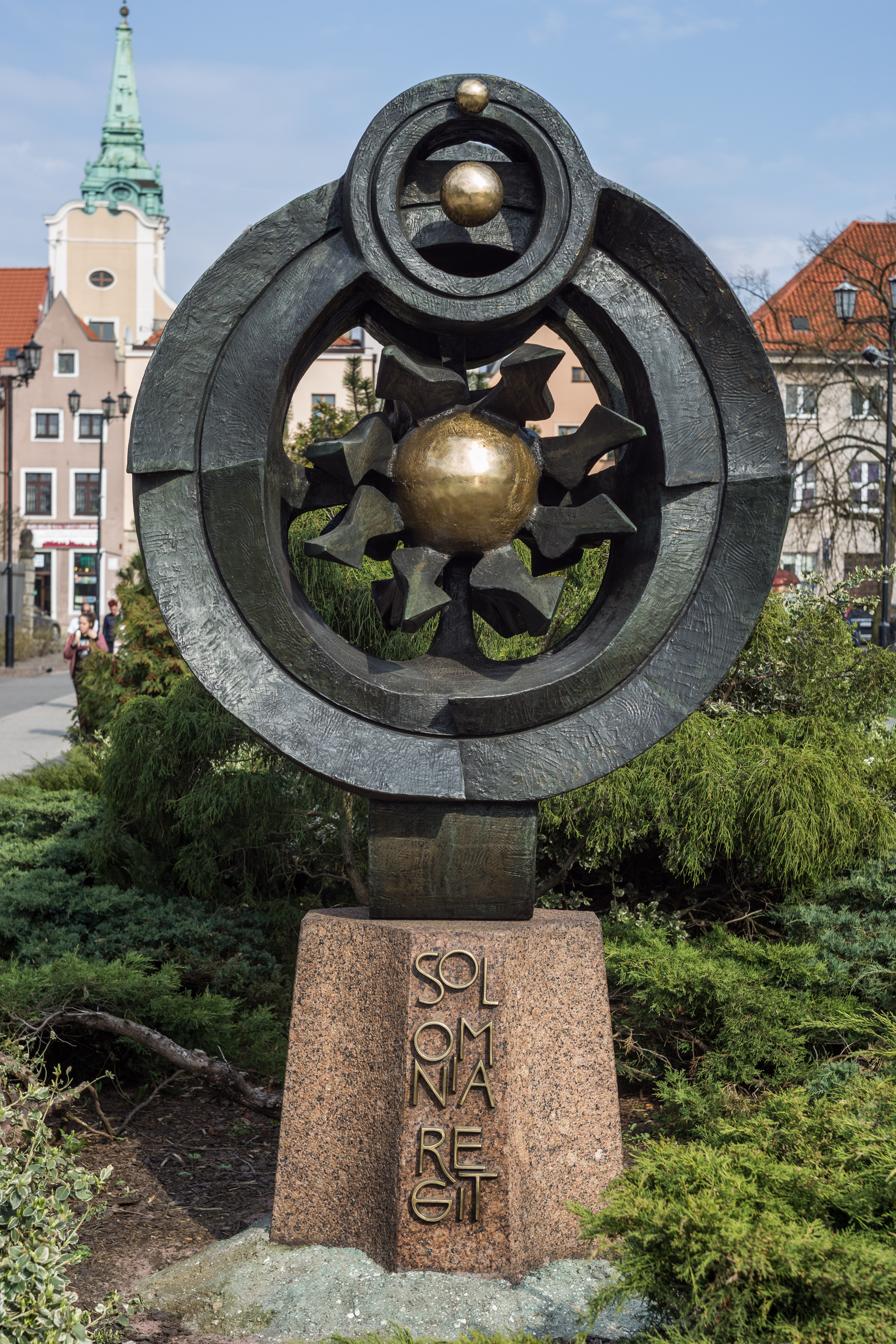
Helios (1973), monument commemorating Copernicus' 500th birth anniversary, Toruń

Kopczyński began his academic career at the Faculty of Graphic Arts, Painting, and Sculpture. He led his own atelier specialising in small sculptural forms from 1963, and became the Faculty's Vice-Dean in 1976. In 1970, he was appointed associate professor, and in 1982, he was awarded the title of professor. He became a full professor at the Academy of Fine Arts in Poznań in 1995.

His first solo exhibition of sculptures, medals, and prints was held in 1970 at the Arsenał Gallery in Poznań. His works are featured in galleries and museums in Stockholm, Helsinki, Madrid, London, and Göttingen.

His notable works include among others Couple under an Umbrella (1967), sculpture of Tytus Działyński (2000), Helios (1973), monument of Mieszko I and Bolesław Chrobry (1975) in front of the Museum of the Origins of the Polish State in Gniezno.

His commemorative works include plaques for Tadeusz Szeligowski in Poznań, Henryk Wieniawski in Vienna, and Stefan Batory in Nyirbator. His medals and plaques are linked to Poznań and Wielkopolska and are part of collections in museums in Poznań, Bydgoszcz, Toruń, and Wrocław.

Kopczyński received numerous awards, including the Minister of Culture and Art Prize (1977), awards from the City of Poznań and the Poznań Voivodeship (1965, 1974), Gold Medal in the 4th Jan Wroniecki Competition for Graphics and Drawing (1971), and Artistic Award of the City of Poznań (2001). He also received first prizes in competitions for monuments of Juliusz Słowacki in Warsaw (1961) and King Przemysl I in Poznań (1968).

== Personal life and legacy ==
In 1964, he married Pelagia Wojewoda, a sculptor and educator. Their children, Małgorzata Kopczyńska-Matusewicz, and Paweł Kopczyński, are also visual artists. Józef Kopczyński is buried in the Alley of Merit at the Miłostowo cemetery in Poznań.

In 2007, the Academy of Fine Arts in Poznań organized the first student competition of small sculptural forms named after Kopczyński, evolving into a biennial by 2009.
