= Jadwiga Roguska =

Polish art historian

- Born: 1941 (age 84–85)
- Education: Warsaw University of Technology
- Occupations: Art historian, architect
- Employer: University of Technology and Arts in Applied Sciences

Jadwiga Roguska (born 1941) is a Polish architect and architectural historian. She is a retired professor at the Faculty of Architecture at the Warsaw University of Technology and at the University of Technology and Arts in Applied Sciences.

== Career ==
She Graduate of the Faculty of Architecture, Warsaw University of Technology (1965). Roguska obtained her doctorate in 1974 under the supervision of Jan Zachwatowicz. From 1991 to 2016, she was the Head of the Department of Global Architecture at the Warsaw University of Technology, and subsequently a professor at the University of Technology and Arts in Applied Sciences in Warsaw.

== Selected publications ==
- Architektura i budownictwo mieszkaniowe w Warszawie w drugiej połowie XIX i na początku XX wieku: architektura willowa (1986). (Architecture and Residential Building in Warsaw in the Second Half of the 19th and Early 20th Centuries: Villa Architecture, 1986).
- Karol Jankowski architekt warszawski początku XX wieku: życie i twórczość (1978). (Karol Jankowski, a Warsaw Architect of the Early 20th Century: Life and Work .1978)
- Dziedzictwo na nowo odkrywane: detal architektoniczny 1850–1939. (Discovering heritage again: architectural detail 1850–1939. red. nauk, 2014).
