= Engineering management =

Engineering management (also called management engineering) is the application of engineering methods, tools, and techniques to business management systems. Engineering management is a career that brings together the technological problem-solving ability of engineering and the organizational, administrative, legal and planning abilities of management in order to oversee the operational performance of complex engineering-driven enterprises.

Universities offering bachelor degrees in engineering management typically have programs covering courses such as engineering management, project management, operations management, logistics, supply chain management, programming concepts, programming applications, operations research, engineering law, value engineering, quality control, quality assurance, six sigma, safety engineering, systems engineering, engineering leadership, accounting, applied engineering design, business statistics and calculus. A Master of Engineering Management (MEM) and Master of Business Engineering (MBE) are sometimes compared to a Master of Business Administration (MBA) for professionals seeking a graduate degree as a qualifying credential for a career in engineering management.

== History ==
Stevens Institute of Technology is believed to have the oldest engineering management department, established as the School of Business Engineering in 1908. This was later called the Bachelor of Engineering in Engineering Management (BEEM) program and moved into the School of Systems and Enterprises. Syracuse University established the first graduate engineering management degree in the United States, which was first offered in 1957. In 1967 the first university department explicitly titled "Engineering Management" was founded at the Missouri University of Science and Technology (Missouri S&T, formerly the University of Missouri-Rolla, formerly Missouri School of Mines).

Inside the United States, other notable engineering management programs includes:

- In 1959, Western Michigan University began offering the predecessor to the modern engineering management bachelor's degree (titled "Industrial Supervision") and in 1977, Western Michigan University started its MS degree in Manufacturing Administration, later renamed as Engineering Management.
- In 1982, at the request of public utility companies in Nebraska, the University of Nebraska - Lincoln started a Master of Engineering in Engineering Management offered by the College of Engineering on-campus and on-site at each utility company across the State. Over the years, delivery expanded to include televised format to be accessible to all engineering companies in the State. In 2008 the program was renamed Master of Engineering Management and transitioned to fully online (web-based) delivery to serve the needs of engineering industry nation-wide and world-wide.
- In 1998, University of Wisconsin–Madison established the predecessor to their online graduate engineering management degree (titled "Master of Engineering in Professional Practice").
- Michigan Technological University began an Engineering Management program in the School of Business & Economics in the Fall of 2012.

Outside the United States, engineering management includes:

- In Germany the first department concentrating on Engineering Management was established 1927 at the Technische Hochschule in Charlottenburg (now Technische Universität Berlin)..
- In Turkey the Istanbul Technical University has a Management Engineering Department established in 1982, offering a number of graduate and undergraduate programs in Management Engineering (in English). In UK the University of Warwick has a specialised department WMG (previously known as Warwick Manufacturing Group) established in 1980, which offers a graduate programme in MSc Engineering Business Management.
- In Canada, Memorial University of Newfoundland has started a complete master's degree Program in Engineering Management.
- In Denmark, the Technical University of Denmark offers a MSc program in Engineering Management (in English).
- In Pakistan, University of Engineering and Technology, Taxila, University of Engineering and Technology, Lahore and National University of Science and Technology (NUST) offer admission both at Master and Doctorate level in Engineering Management while Capital University of Science & Technology (CUST), NED University of Engineering & Technology, Karachi and Ghulam Ishaq Khan Institute of Engineering Sciences and Technology have been running a Master of Engineering/MS in Engineering Management program. A variant of this program is within Quality Management. COMSATS (CIIT) offers a MSc Project Management program to Local and Overseas Pakistanis as an on-campus/off-campus student.
- In Poland, Warsaw University of Technology, Poznań University of Technology, WSB Merito University (Toruń branch), Wrocław University of Science and Technology, Kielce University of Technology all offer first-cycle studies (inżynier, EQF Level 6), with some of them also offering second-cycle studies (magister inżynier, EQF Level 7).
- In Italy, the first Engineering Management program was established in 1972 at the University of Calabria by Beniamino Andreatta. Politecnico di Milano offers degrees in Management Engineering., among many other public or private (and publicly-accredited) universities belonging to the same post-secondary academic degrees' classification.
- In Morocco, École Nationale Supérieure des Mines de Rabat offers an Engineering Management degree (three years of study full time with a selective admission for Associate or bachelor degree holders). The degree offered is referred to locally as Diplôme d'Ingénieur and is equivalent to Master level degree.
- In Russia, since 2014 the Faculty of Engineering Management of The Russian Presidential Academy of National Economy and Public Administration (RANEPA) offers bachelor's and master's degrees in Engineering Management.
- In France, the EPF will offer, from January 2018, a 2-year Engineering & Management major in English for the 4th and 5th years of its 5-year Engineering master's degree. The final two years are open to students who have completed an undergraduate engineering degree elsewhere.

== Areas of practice ==
Engineering management is a broad field and can cover a wide range of technical and managerial topics. An important resource is the Engineering Management Body of Knowledge (EMBoK). The topics below are representative of typical topics in the field.

=== Leadership and organization management ===
Leadership and organization management are concerned with the skills involving positive direction of technical organizations and motivation of employees. Often a manager must shape engineering policy within an organization.

=== Operations, operations research, and supply chain ===
Operations management is concerned with designing and controlling the process of production and redesigning business operations in the production of goods or services. Operations research deals with quantitative models of complex operations and uses these models to support decision-making in any sector of industry or public services. Supply chain management is the process of planning, implementing and managing the flow of goods, services and related information from the point of origin to the point of consumption.

=== Engineering law ===
Engineering law and the related statutes are critical to management practice and engineering. Engineering legislation makes engineering a controlled activity and an engineering manager must know which statutes apply to their practice. Codes of ethics can be enshrined in law. Professional misconduct and negligence are defined in law. An engineering manager must be licensed as an engineer and may have engineers, technicians and natural scientists reporting to her or him. Understanding how licensed engineers supervise non-licensed technicians and natural scientists is critical to safe practice.

An engineering manager must always use engineering legislation to push back against schedule pressure or budget pressure to ensure public safety.

=== Management of technology ===
Introducing and utilizing new technology is a major route to cost reduction and quality improvement in production engineering. The management of technology (MOT) theme builds on the foundation of management topics in accounting, finance, economics, organizational behavior and organizational design. Courses in this theme deal with operational and organizational issues related to managing innovation and technological change.

=== New product development and product engineering ===
New product development (NPD) is the complete process of bringing a new product to market. Product engineering refers to the process of designing and developing a device, assembly, or system such that it be produced as an item for sale through some production manufacturing process. Product engineering usually entails activity dealing with issues of cost, producibility, quality, performance, reliability, serviceability, intended lifespan and user features. Project management techniques are used to manage the design and development progress using the phase-gate model in the product development process. Design for manufacturability (also sometimes known as design for manufacturing or DFM) is the general engineering art of designing products in such a way that they are easy to manufacture.

=== Systems engineering ===
Systems engineering is an interdisciplinary field of engineering and engineering management that focuses on how to design and manage complex systems over their life cycles.

=== Industrial engineering ===
Industrial engineering is a branch of engineering which deals with the optimization of complex processes, systems or organizations. Industrial engineers work to eliminate waste of time, money, materials, man-hours, machine time, energy and other resources that do not generate value.

=== Management science ===
Management science uses various scientific research-based principles, strategies, and analytical methods including mathematical modeling, statistics and numerical algorithms to improve an organization's ability to enact rational and meaningful management decisions by arriving at optimal or near optimal solutions to complex decision problems.

=== Engineering design management ===
Engineering design management represents the adaptation and application of customary management practices, with the intention of achieving a productive engineering design process. Engineering design management is primarily applied in the context of engineering design teams, whereby the activities, outputs and influences of design teams are planned, guided, monitored and controlled.

=== Human factors safety culture ===
Critical to management success in engineering is the study of human factors and safety culture involved with highly complex tasks within organizations large and small. In complex engineering systems, human factors safety culture can be critical in preventing catastrophe and minimizing the realized hazard rate. Critical areas of safety culture are minimizing blame avoidance, minimizing power distance, an appropriate ambiguity tolerance and minimizing a culture of concealment. Increasing organizational empathy and an ability to clearly report problems up the chain of management is important to the success of any engineering program.

Managing an engineering firm is in opposition to the management of a law firm. Law firms keep secrets while engineering firms succeed when information is deiminated clearly and quickly. Engineering managers must push against a culture of concealment which may be promoted by the law department.

Managers in an engineering firm must be ready to push back against schedule and budget constraints from the executive suite. Engineering managers must use engineering law to push back against the executive suite to ensure public safety. The executive suite in an engineering organization can become consumed with financial data imperiling public safety.

== Education ==
Engineering management programs typically include instruction in accounting, economics, finance, project management, systems engineering, industrial engineering, mathematical modeling and optimization, management information systems, quality control and six sigma, operations management, operations research, human resources management, industrial psychology, safety and health.

There are many options for entering into engineering management, albeit that the foundation requirement is an engineering license.

=== Undergraduate degrees ===
Although most engineering management programs are geared toward graduate studies, there are a number of institutions that teach EM at the undergraduate level. Over twenty undergraduate engineering management related programs are accredited by ABET including: West Point (United States Military Academy), Western Michigan University (ABET-accredited by ETAC of ABET), Stevens Institute of Technology, Clarkson University, Gonzaga University, Virginia Tech, Arizona State University, and the Missouri University of Science and Technology. Graduates of these programs regularly command nearly $65,000 their first year out of school.

Indiana State University offers BS in Engineering Technology Management (ABET/ETAC accredited) degree.

Outside the US, the Istanbul Technical University offers an undergraduate degree in Management Engineering, attracting top students. The Ateneo de Manila University limits admission to its four-year undergraduate degree program in Management Engineering to the top 10% of entrance exam passers. The University of Waterloo offers a 4-year undergraduate degree (five years including co-op education) in the field of Management Engineering. This is the first program of its kind in Canada. In Peru, Universidad del Pacífico offers a five-year undergraduate degree in this field, the first program in this country. In Germany, ESB Business School offers a 4-year undergraduate program which consists of five semesters at ESB Business School, two mandatory internships, one is mandatory to be in another country than Germany, and also one mandatory semester abroad. In the annual applied university ranking of the magazine Wirtschaftswoche, the Engineering Management course of ESB Business School is ranked on place five of all applied universities in Germany. The magazine surveyed more than 500 recruiters in the German industry from which university they are most likely to recruit students and which universities satisfy their needs regarding experience in working with projects, multilingual education, and ability to communicate most.

University of Sharjah in United Arab Emirates offers a BSc in Engineering Management degree (ABET/EAC accredited).

=== Graduate degrees ===
Many universities offer Master of Engineering Management or PhD degrees.

St. Cloud State University offers two graduate programs in engineering management that are certified by the American Society for Engineering Management (ASEM): the Master of Engineering Management (MEM) and the Executive Master of Engineering Management (EMEM), delivered at its Minneapolis‑area campuses in Minnesota. Both programs received ASEM’s Founder’s Award, which recognizes excellence in graduate engineering management education and program leadership. Graduates of these programs are eligible for ASEM’s Certified Associate in Engineering Management (CAEM) credential and the Certified Professional in Engineering Management (CPEM) credential without a separate examination. The programs also offer Curricular Practical Training (CPT) opportunities for international students.

Northwestern University offers the Master of Engineering Management (MEM) program since 1976. The program is administered out of the Department of Industrial Engineering and Management Sciences. Students take courses across different schools of the university such as McCormick school of Engineering, Kellogg School of Management, Farley Center for Entrepreneurship and Innovation, Segal Design Institute. Graduates students are admitted based on eligibility criteria that includes minimum work experience of 3 years.

Missouri S&T is credited with awarding the first Ph.D. in Engineering Management in 1984. The National Institute of Industrial Engineering based in Mumbai has been awarding degrees in the field of Post Graduate Diploma in Industrial Engineering since 1973 and the Fellowship (Doctoral) degrees have been awarded since 2008.

Western Michigan University began offering the MS in Manufacturing Administration degree in 1977 and later renamed the degree as Master of Science in Engineering Management. WMU's MSEM alumni work in the automotive, medical, manufacturing, and service sectors, often in roles of project manager, engineering manager, and senior leadership in engineering and technical organizations.

Cornell University started one of the first Engineering Management Masters programs in 1988 with the launch of their Master of Engineering (M.Eng.) in Engineering Management. The program allows students access to courses and programs in the College of Engineering, Johnson School of Management, and across Cornell University more broadly.

Massachusetts Institute of Technology offers a Master in System Design and Management, which is a member of the Consortium of Engineering Management.

The University of Texas at Austin's Cockrell School of Engineering has offered a Master of Science in Engineering Management (MEM) since 1999, administered by Texas Engineering Executive Education (TxEEE) in partnership with the McCombs School of Business.

Indiana State University started offering a PhD in Technology Management degree in 1998. This is a consortium-based program.

Lamar University offers a Master of Engineering Management degree with flexible content to adjust to diverse engineering fields, with core content that includes operations management, accounting, and decision sciences.

Netaji Subhas Institute of Technology (NSIT) New Delhi also provides M.tech degree in Engineering management. Admission to this program happens through GATE (Graduate Aptitude Test in Engineering) examination.

Students in the University of Kansas' Engineering Management Program are practicing professionals employed by over 100 businesses, manufacturing, government or consulting firms. There are over 200 actively enrolled students in the program and approximately 500 alumni.

University of Sharjah in United Arab Emirates offers MSc EM and PhD EM degrees.

Istanbul Technical University Management Engineering Department offers a graduate degree, and a Ph.D. in Management Engineering.

== Management engineering consulting ==
Large and small engineering driven firms often require the expertise of external management consultants that specialize in companies where engineering practice and product development are key drivers of value. Most engineering management consultants will have as a minimum a professional engineering qualification. But usually they will also have graduate degrees in engineering and or business or a management consulting designation. It involves providing management consulting service that is specific to professional engineering practice or to the engineering industry sector. Engineering management consultancies, are typically boutique firms and have a more specialized focus than the traditional mainstream consulting firms, A T Kearney, Boston Consulting Group, KPMG, PWC, and McKinsey. Applied science and engineering practice requires a combination of "management art", science, and engineering practice. There are many professional service companies delivering services in a consultancy type relationship to the engineering industry, including law, accounting, human resources, marketing, politics, economics, finance, public affairs, and communication. Commonly, engineering management consultants are used when firms require a combination of special technical knowledge, and management know how, to enhance knowledge or transform organizational performance and also keep any intellectual property developed confidential.

Engineering management consulting is concerned with the development, improvement, implementation and evaluation of integrated systems of organizations, people, money, knowledge, information, equipment, energy, materials and/or processes. Management Engineering Consultants strive to improve upon existing organizations, processes, products or systems. Engineering management consulting draws upon the principles and methods of engineering analysis and synthesis, as well as the mathematical, physical and social sciences together with the principles and methods of engineering design to specify, predict, and evaluate the results to be obtained from such systems or processes. Engineering management consulting can focus on the social impact of the product, process or system that is being analyzed. There is also an overlap between engineering management consulting and management science in services that require the adoption of more analytical approaches to problem solving.

Examples of where engineering management consulting might be used include developing and leading a company wide business transformation initiative, or designing and implementing a new product development process, designing and implementing a manufacturing engineering process, including an automated assembly workstation. Management engineers may specialize in the acquisition and implementation of computer aided design (CAD), computer-aided manufacturing (CAM) and computer-aided engineering (CAE) applications. Services may include strategizing for various operational logistics, new product introductions, or consulting as an efficiency expert. It may include using management science techniques to develop a new financial algorithm or loan system for a bank, streamlining operation and emergency room location or usage in a hospital, planning complex distribution schemes for materials or products (referred to as supply chain management), and shortening lines (or queues) at a bank, hospital, or a theme park. Management engineering consultants typically use computer simulation (especially discrete event simulation), along with extensive mathematical tools and modeling and computational methods for system analysis, evaluation, and optimization.

== Professional organizations ==
There are a number of societies and organizations dedicated to the field of engineering management. One of the largest societies is a division of IEEE, the Engineering Management Society, which regularly publishes a trade magazine. Another prominent professional organization in the field is the American Society for Engineering Management (ASEM), which was founded in 1979 by a group of 20 engineering managers from industry. ASEM currently certifies engineering managers (two levels) via the Certified Associate in Engineering Management (CAEM) or Certified Professional in Engineering Management (CPEM) certification exam. The Master of Engineering Management Programs Consortium is a consortium of nine universities intended to raise the value and visibility of the MEM degree. Also, engineering management graduate programs have the possibility of being accredited by ABET, ATMAE, or ASEM. In Canada, the Canadian Society for Engineering Management (CSEM) is a constituent society of the Engineering Institute of Canada (EIC), Canada's oldest learned engineering society.

== See also ==
- Business engineering
- Business manager
- Construction management
- Engineering information management
- Engineering law
- Enterprise engineering
- Industrial engineering
- List of engineering topics
- List of management topics
- Remote laboratory
- Systems engineering

Associations
- American Society for Engineering Management (ASEM)
- INFORMS
