= Przegląd Elektrotechniczny =

- Discipline: Electrical engineering
- Language: Polish, English
- Edited by: Mariusz Malinowski (Warsaw University of Technology)

Publication details
- History: 1919–present
- Frequency: Monthly
- Open access: Yes

Standard abbreviations
- ISO 4: Prz. Elektrotech.

Indexing
- ISSN: 0033-2097 (print); 2449-9544 (web)

Links
- Journal homepage; Online Archive

Przegląd Elektrotechniczny (English: Electrical Engineering Review) is a monthly scientific journal covering electrical engineering and the oldest Polish journal in this field. It was established in 1919 by Wydawnictwo SIGMA-NOT. Initially it only covered electrical engineering in a narrow sense, but nowadays it also covers related topics, such as electronics, power systems, power electronics, traction, metrology, machines, transformers, and material engineering.
