= Jerzy Barycki =

Polish-Canadian civil engineer

Jerzy (Jerry) Barycki
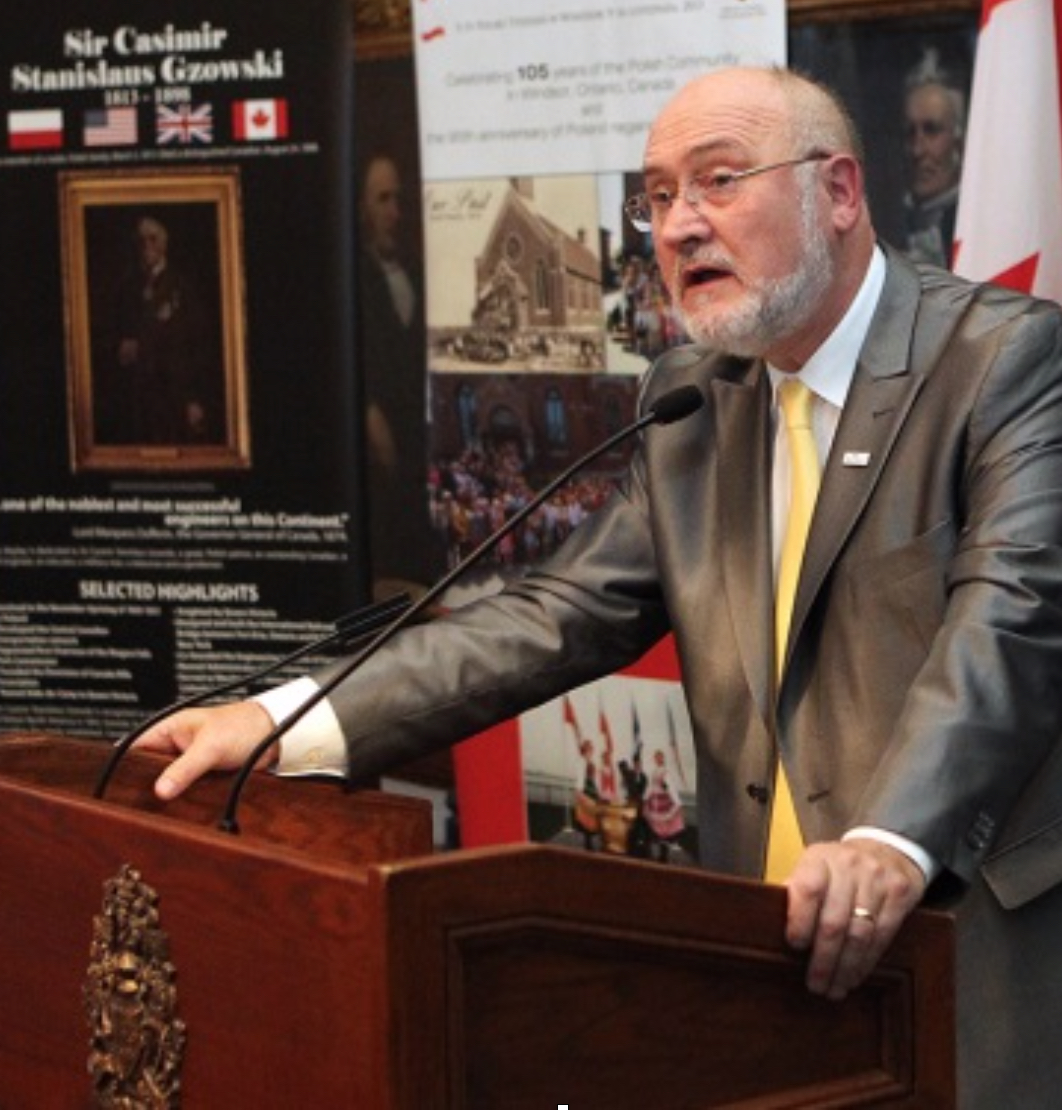
- During a speech in the Parliament of Canada in Ottawa (2013)
- Born: 15 March 1949 (age 77); Wysokie Mazowieckie, Poland
- Education: Warsaw University of Technology
- Occupation: Civil Engineer
- Organization: Polish-Canadian Business and Professional Association of Windsor
- Awards: Cross of Merit (Poland); Order of Merit of the Republic of Poland; Queen Elizabeth II Diamond Jubilee Medal; Sovereign’s Medal for Volunteers

Jerzy (Jerry) Barycki (b. March 15, 1949 in Wysokie Mazowieckie, Poland) is a Polish-Canadian water resources engineer and civic activist, honorary consul of the Republic of Poland in Windsor, Ontario.

== Career ==
Graduate of the Warsaw University of Technology, Department of Water Resources (1974), worked with Hydroprojekt Warszawa (1974–1976) and PBI Inżynieria Warszawa (1976–1980), where he supervised Warsaw’s constructions, including the building of infrastructure for the Wilga and Orlik housing estates.

Living in Canada from 1982, he worked professionally on construction, inspection and planning of municipal infrastructure in Windsor, Ontario. He worked for the construction firm Scofan Contractors and the Consulting Office of N.K. Becker & Associates and from 1990-2010 supervised the construction of several dozen housing subdivisions in LaSalle, Ontario. Member of Professional Engineers Ontario (1994-), the Canadian Society for Civil Engineering (1997-2010) and the Association of Municipal Engineers (1998-2010).

== Civic activist ==
Community activist and organiser of numerous Polish diaspora events in Windsor. From 1988, for many years Vice President and Secretary of the Board of Directors of the Housing Estate “Polonia Park” (342 apartments). Chair of the Construction Committee and for several years Vice President of the Polish People’s Home Association in Windsor (1995-2002). Co-founder and President of the Polish-Canadian Business and Professional Association of Windsor (1997-). In 2000, initiator and co-founder of the twinning partnership of Windsor and Lublin. Co-organiser and participant, many official delegations to Lublin. Member of International Relations Committee of the City of Windsor (2002-). Organiser of many Polonia events in Windsor, concerts, “Polish Weeks in Windsor”, theme-oriented displays at many cities across Canada (“Famous Canadians of Polish Heritage”, “Members of Parliament of Polish Heritage”, “The Kosciuszko Camp”, “The Wawel Treasures”, “Jan Paweł II”, etc.). Joint creator and project designer of six of the displays in the Canada 150 series (2017).

Co-founder and President, Canadian Polish Congress, Windsor-Chatham Branch (2002-2006, 2012-2018, 2020-), Vice-President, CPC Head Council (2005-2020), Director (2018- ), Acting President (2009-2010); Member, CPC Council (2002-2010, 2012-2018, 2020-) and Chair (2016-2018). Advisor to periodic conferences of young professionals of Polish heritage “Quo Vadis” (2009-). Director, Head Council of Polish Combatants’ Association of Canada (2013-); Member, World Polonia Council (2007 and 2017-); Director, Polonia Centre (Windsor), Inc. (1989-1990, 2011-); Director, Council of Polish Canadian Centre Association of Windsor (1988-2010).

Since 2025 honorary consul of the Republic of Poland in Windsor, Ontario.

== Awards and honours ==
Holder of many Canadian awards, at both provincial and federal levels. Received Ted Glista Memorial Award 2003 for community activities. Awarded Gold Cross of Merit (2007), Knight’s Cross of the Order of Merit of the Republic of Poland (2005), the Officer’s Cross of the Order of Merit of the Republic of Poland (2010), the Medal of the Mayor of Lublin (2001, 2019), the Medal of the Lublin Union (2005), the Gold Award of Merit of the Canadian Polish Congress (2009), the Silver Medal for Merit to Culture – Gloria Artis (2013), the Queen Elizabeth II Diamond Jubilee Medal (2012), the Sovereign's Medal for Volunteers (2017), the Medal of the Senate of the Republic of Poland (2018), and the Sir C.S. Gzowski Leadership Medal (2019).

== Personal life ==
Married to Ewa, Senior Engineer in the City of Windsor Construction Department. Daughter Ania, Parliament of Ontario staff member (2019), later in Ontario’s Ministry of Colleges and Universities.

== Bibliography ==
- Dopierała, Kazimierz, ed. (2005). Encyklopedia Polskiej Emigracji i Polonii. Toruń: Oficyna Wydawnicza Kucharski. ISBN 83-89376-15-6.
- Kozak, J.; Piwowarek, T., eds. (2006). Polacy w Kanadzie – Słownik Biograficzny. Mississauga: Biogram Publishing. ISBN 0-9738143-0-6. OCLC 76318337.
- Pasek, Zbigniew S., ed. (2014). Wielka Encyklopedia Polonii Świata. Częstochowa: Wydawnictwo Naukowe PWN SA. ISBN 978-83-7542-116-3.
- Twórcy wizerunku Polonii. Fundacja Sendeka. 2001. ISBN 978-83-948675-1-5.
- Rajski, Agata (2008). 100 lat Polonii w Windsor, 1908-2008 (One Century of the Polish Community in Windsor, 1908-2008). Brzesko: Brzeska Oficyna Wydawnicza (transl. Frank Simpson). ISBN 978-0-9781290-3-3.
