= Wysokie Mazowieckie =

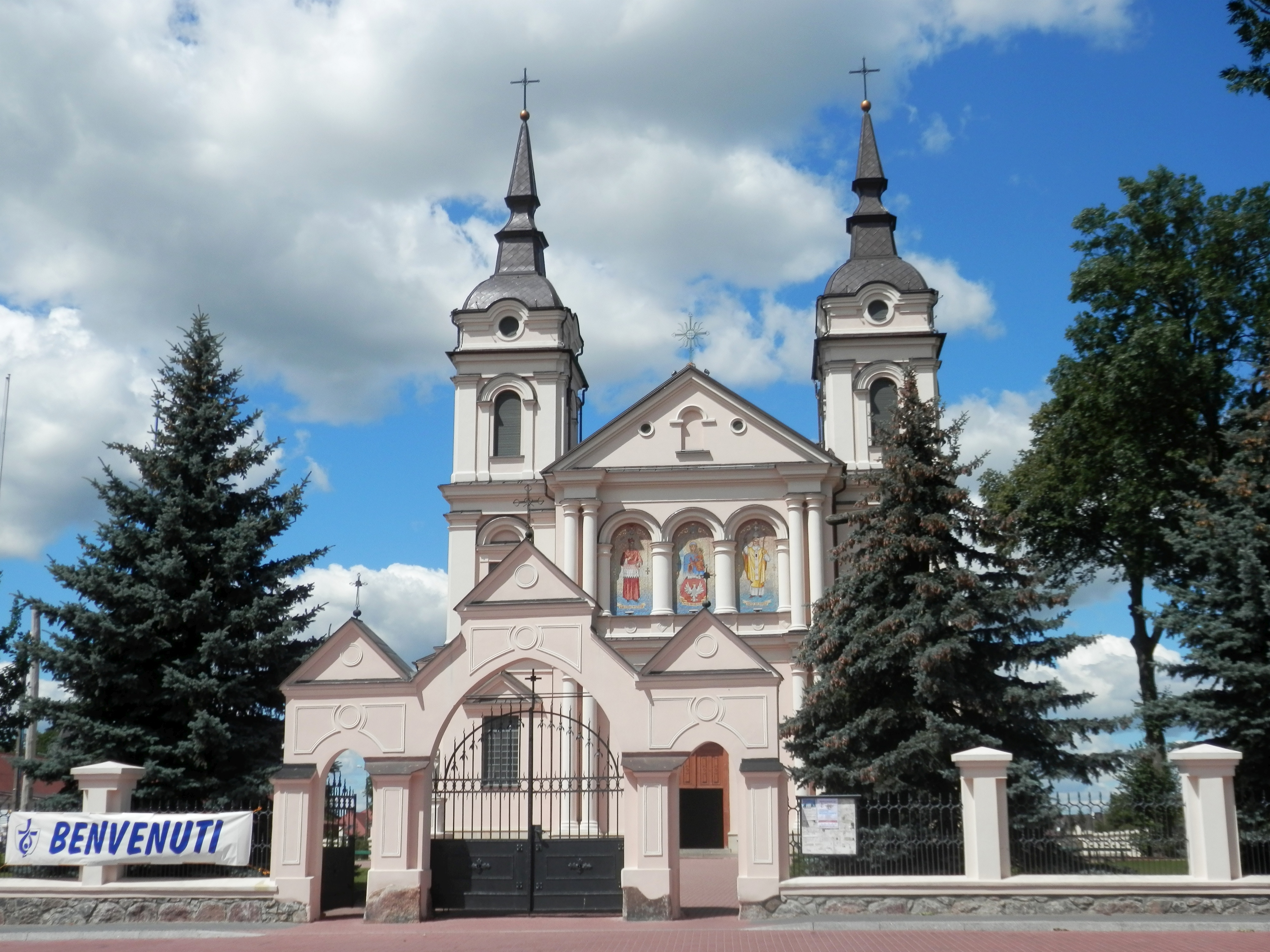
- Saint John the Baptist and All Saints church in Wysokie Mazowieckie

- Flag Coat of arms

- Location within Poland
- Coordinates: 52°55′9″N 22°30′52″E
- Country: Poland
- Voivodeship: Podlaskie
- County: Wysokie Mazowieckie
- Gmina: urban gmina

Government
  - Mayor: Jarosław Siekierko

Area
  - Total: 15.24 km^{2} (5.88 sq mi)

Population (2013)
  - Total: 9,503
  - Density: 623.6/km^{2} (1,615/sq mi)
- Time zone: UTC+1 (CET)
  - Summer (DST): UTC+2 (CEST)
- Postal code: 18-200
- Area code: +48 086
- Car plates: BWM
- Website: wysokiemazowieckie.pl

Wysokie Mazowieckie ([vɨˈsɔkʲɛ mazɔˈvjɛt͡skʲɛ]; Yiddish: וויסאקע-מאזאוויעצק, romanized: Visoka-Mazovietzk) is a town in north-eastern Poland, in Podlaskie Voivodeship. It is the capital of Wysokie Mazowieckie County. Population is 10,034 as of 2005.

== History ==
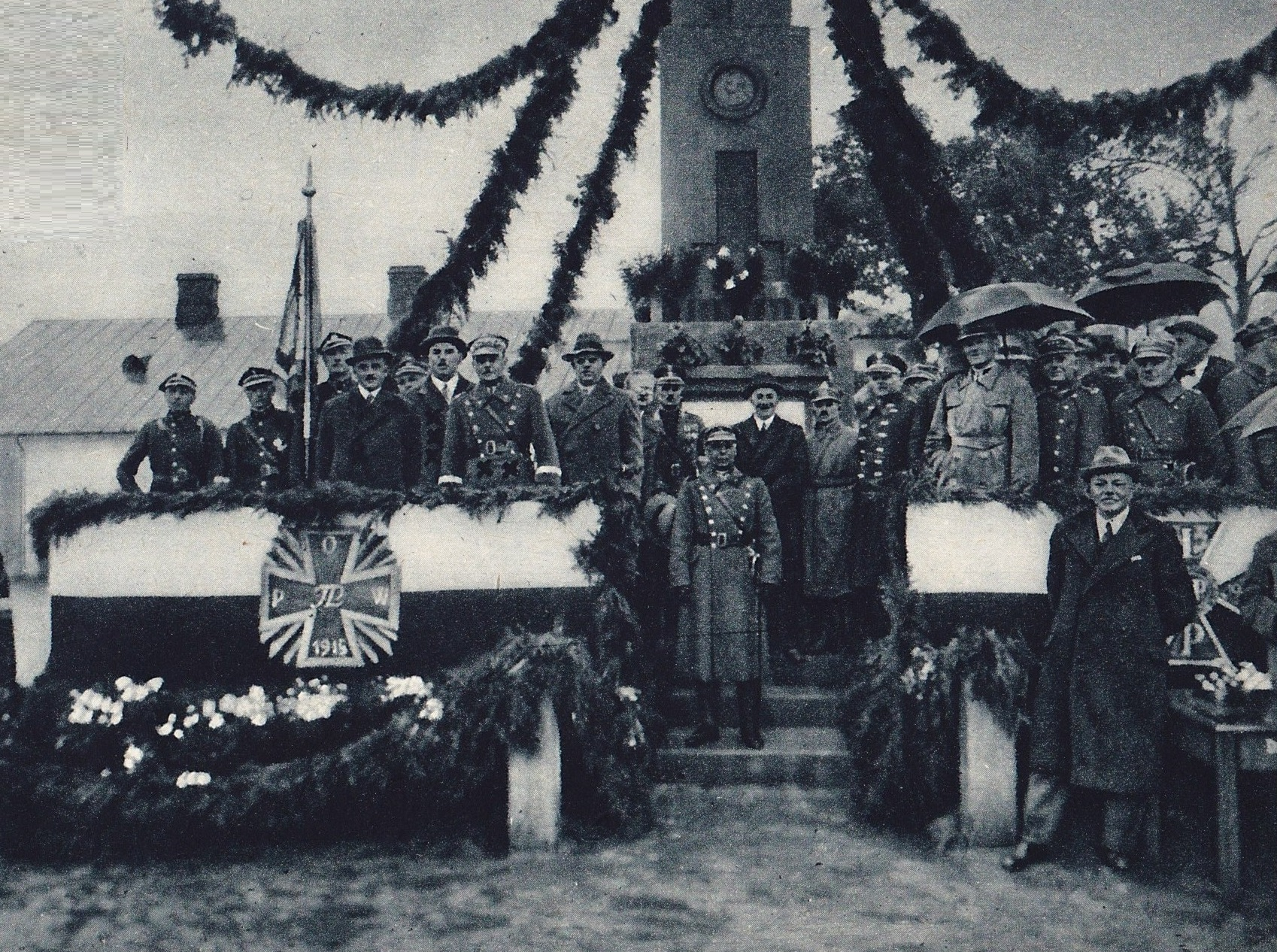
Dedication of the banner of the Polish Military Organization in 1932

Wysokie was founded by Polish settlers from nearby Mazovia in the Middle Ages. It was a royal settlement, and in 1469 the first parish church was founded. In 1503, Alexander Jagiellon granted Magdeburg town rights, confirmed previous laws, and granted brewing rights to the townspeople. Later, it became a private town of various Polish nobles, including the Potocki and Piotrowski families, administratively located in the Podlaskie Voivodeship in the Lesser Poland Province of the Kingdom of Poland. King Stanisław August Poniatowski established four annual fairs thanks to efforts of Andrzej Piotrowski.

Following the German-Soviet invasion of Poland, which started World War II in September 1939, the town was occupied by the Soviet Union until 1941, then by Germany until 1944.

== Economy ==
In town there is one of the biggest dairy companies in this part of Europe - "Mlekovita". in 2018, the city was among the richest municipalities in Poland, has ranked 11th in the country

== Jewish cemetery ==
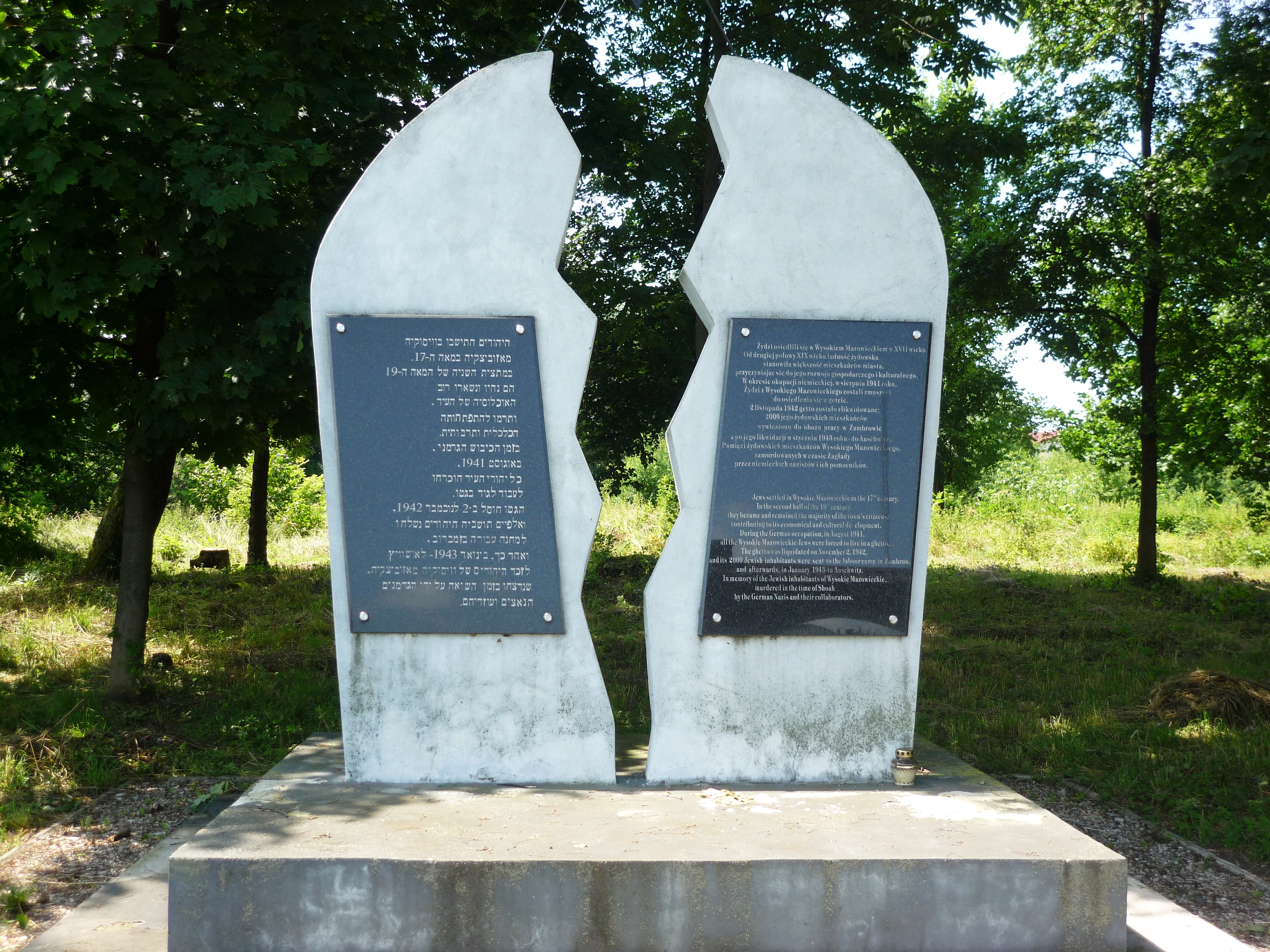
Holocaust memorial

The Jewish cemetery in Wysokie Mazowieckie had been devastated in World War II. It was restored in 2006 and, protected by a fence, is maintained regularly by the Foundation for the Preservation of Jewish Heritage in Poland. The Jewish cemetery contains a memorial to local Jews who were murdered in the Holocaust. The memorial monument was vandalized in August 2012.

== Transport ==
Wysokie Mazowieckie lies on national road 66 which connects it to Zambrów and Bielsk Podlaski.

The nearest railway station is in the town of Szepietowo to the south-east.

== Sport ==
- Ruch Wysokie Mazowieckie - Polish football club

== International relations ==
=== Twin towns – Sister cities ===
Wysokie Mazowieckie is twinned with:

- Alpiarça, Portugal
- Maišiagala, Lithuania
- Vysokaye, Belarus

== Notable people ==
- Jerzy Barycki (born 1949 in Wysokie Mazowieckie), Polish-Canadian water resources engineer and civic activist
- Jacek Bogucki (born 1959 in Wysokie Mazowieckie), Polish politician. He was elected to the Sejm on 25 September 2005 with 7,189 votes in 24 Białystok district as a candidate from the Law and Justice list.
- Wojciech Borzuchowski (born 1961 in Wysokie Mazowieckie), Polish politician, a member of Law and Justice party until 2007, when he joined the Polish People's Party. He was elected to Sejm on 25 September 2001 and served until 2005.
- Jacob Burck (1907–1982), Polish-born Jewish-American painter, sculptor, and award-winning editorial cartoonist. Active in the Communist movement from 1926 as a political cartoonist and muralist, Burck quit the Communist Party after a visit to the Soviet Union in 1936, deeply offended by political demands there to manipulate his work.
- Przemysław Czajkowski (born 1988 in Wysokie Mazowieckie), Polish athlete specializing in the discus throw. His personal best in the event is 65.61 meters, achieved in 2012 in Łódź.
- Jan Stanisław Jankowski (1882–1953; noms de guerre Doktor, Jan, Klonowski, Sobolewski, Soból), Polish politician, an important figure in the Polish civil resistance during World War II and a Government Delegate at Home. Arrested by the NKVD, he was sentenced in the Trial of the Sixteen and murdered in a Soviet prison.
- Kazimierz Kamieński (nom de guerre "Gryf" and "Huzar"; 1919–1953), Polish Army officer, commander in the underground Polish Home Army (AK), ROAK and the anti-communist organization Freedom and Independence (WiN). He was one of the longest fighting soldiers of the Polish anti-Communist resistance after World War II.
- Jan Kucharzewski (1876–1952), Polish historian, lawyer, and politician. He was the prime minister of Poland from 1917 to 1918.
- Łukasz Załuska (born 1982), Polish professional football goalkeeper.
