= Mariusz Malinowski =

Polish electrical engineer

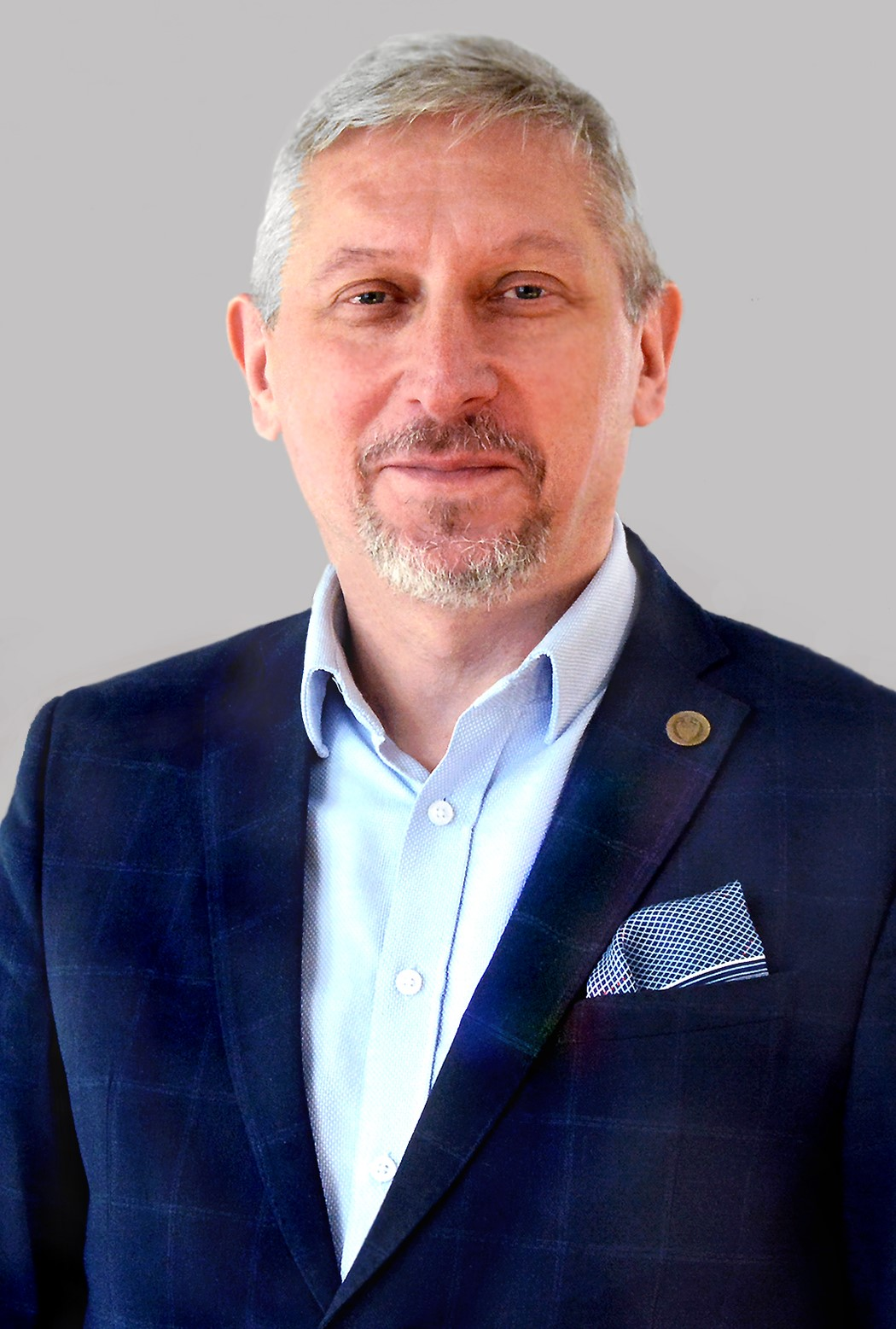
- Born: 1972 (age 53–54); Radom, Poland
- Education: Warsaw University of Technology
- Awards: Siemens Prize (2002, 2007) IEEE IES David Irwin Early Career Award (2011); Prime Minister of Poland Award (2013) IEEE IES David Bimal Bose Award for Industrial Electronics Applications in Energy Systems (2015)
- Scientific career
- Fields: Electrical engineering, Power electronics, Industrial electronics, Automation, Robotics
- Workplaces: Institute of Control and Industrial Electronics
- Thesis: Sensorless control strategies for three-phase PWM rectifiers (2001)

Mariusz Malinowski (born 1972 in Radom, Poland) is a Polish electrical engineer and professor of technical sciences, specializing in automation, computer engineering, industrial electronics, power electronics, robotics, and electrical engineering. He serves as Vice-Rector for Research at Warsaw University of Technology during the 2020–2024 and 2024–2028 terms.

His research interests also include electric drives, electromobility, smart grids, and renewable energy sources.

== Biography ==
Mariusz Malinowski graduated with distinction in electrical engineering from the Warsaw University of Technology in 1997, receiving an award for the best diploma thesis from the Warsaw Branch of the Association of Polish Electrical Engineers (SEP), the Dean of the Faculty of Electrical Engineering, and the Polish Section of IEEE. He received his PhD with honors in 2001 for his dissertation titled “Sensorless control strategies for three-phase PWM rectifiers”, which received the Siemens Award.

In 2012, he obtained a postdoctoral degree (habilitation) for a monographic series of publications entitled “Selected problems of modulation and control for two- and multilevel voltage source converters.” Since 2002, he has been affiliated with the Institute of Control and Industrial Electronics at the Faculty of Electrical Engineering, Warsaw University of Technology. Initially, he held the position of assistant professor; between 2013 and 2019, he served as university professor, and since 2019, he has been a full professor. From 2017 to 2020, he was Head of the Department of Industrial Electronics at the same institute.

== Scientific and Academic Activities ==
He was a recipient of scholarships from the Foundation for Polish Science: Start (2001, 2002) and Kolumb (2003). He has been repeatedly awarded by the Rector of the Warsaw University of Technology for scientific achievements. He conducted scientific internships abroad at institutions including Aalborg University (Denmark), University of Nevada, Reno (USA), and ETH Zurich (Switzerland).

He has participated in over 30 research and industrial projects as a principal investigator or main contributor. His implementations were recognized in the Polish Product of the Future competition in 2006 and 2015. He has collaborated with, among others, ABB Corporate Research Center, PSE Operator, Twerd, Lopi, TRUMPF Huettinger, and Danfoss.

He has served as a reviewer and member of evaluation committees for numerous PhD theses in Poland and abroad, including in Germany, the United Kingdom, Spain, Italy, Estonia, Denmark, Switzerland, India, and Australia. He has supervised six PhD students, five of whom received honors. One of the doctoral theses defended under his guidance won the best doctoral thesis award in a competition organized by ABB, and another doctoral thesis won the best doctoral thesis award in a competition organized by TRUMPF Huettinger. In 2016 and 2018, he received the Golden Chalk award from students in the category of Best Lecturer. Since 2019, he has been twice elected to the Council of Scientific Excellence (Poland). Since 2021, he has been a of the Division of Technical Sciences of the Polish Academy of Sciences.

In 2023, he was appointed to the Scientific Council of the Institute of Fundamental Technological Research of the Polish Academy of Sciences (2023–2026), and in 2024, to the Scientific Council of the Łukasiewicz Research Network – Institute for Sustainable Technologies (2024–2027). He is the author of numerous monographs, book chapters, and over 200 articles published in journals and conference proceedings. He is also the inventor of several patents, including some that have been implemented by the industry.

Since 2010, he has been active in the Institute of Electrical and Electronics Engineers (IEEE). Since 2014, he has held the highest grade – IEEE Fellow – awarded for exceptional technical and organizational achievements.

== Selected Positions and Functions ==
Sources:

- IEEE Board of Director Division VI (2027-2028)
- IEEE Director - Elect Division VI (2026)
- Editor-in-Chief of Przegląd Elektrotechniczny (from 2025)
- Co-Chair of the ENHANCE Board of Directors (from 2024)
- Envoy of CESAER in the Polish EU Council Presidency (2024)
- President of the IEEE Industrial Electronics Society (2022–2023)
- Chair of the IEEE Poland Section (2016–2019)
- Vice-Chair of the IEEE Poland Section (2014–2015)
- Editor-in-Chief of IEEE Industrial Electronics Magazine (2010–2012)
- Chair of the Scientific Council of the Archives of Electrical Engineering

== Selected Awards and Honors ==
Sources:

- Silver Honorary Badge of the Association of Polish Electrical Engineers (SEP) (2023)
- Istvan Nagy Award for outstanding contributions to power electronics control and continuous support of PEMC conferences (2021)
- IEEE-IES Anthony J. Hornfeck Service Award for outstanding service to the IEEE Industrial Electronics Society (2020)
- Prime Minister’s Team Award for scientific and technical achievement (2017)
- IEEE-IES Bimal Bose Award for Industrial Electronics Applications in Energy Systems for contributions in control of industrial electronics converters (Yokohama, Japan, 2015)
- Warsaw University of Technology Scientific Award (now named after Ignacy Mościcki) for notable achievements and successful technology transfer (2015)
- Prime Minister’s Award for outstanding achievements leading to the habilitation degree (2013)
- IEEE-IES David Irwin Early Career Award for outstanding R&D in modulation and control of industrial electronics converters (Melbourne, Australia, 2011)
- Minister of Science and Higher Education Award for international scientific achievements (2008)
- Siemens Research Team Award (2007)
