= Jan Holnicki-Szulc =

Polish engineer, author, and academic

- Born: June 22, 1945 (age 81); Poland
- Occupations: Structural engineer, author and academic

Academic background
- Education: Master of Science in Engineering; Master of Science in Mathematics; Doctor of Philosophy in Technical Sciences; Habilitation in Engineering
- Alma mater: Warsaw University of Technology; University of Warsaw; Institute of Fundamental Technological Research Polish Academy of Sciences
- Thesis: Zagadnienia dystorsji sprężystych w wieloelementowych układach konstrukcyjnych: analiza, identyfikacja, sterowanie (1980)

Jan Holnicki-Szulc (born June 22, 1945) is a Polish structural engineer, author, and academic. He is a professor at the Institute of Fundamental Technological Research Polish Academy of Sciences (IPPT-PAN) and serves as the Head of the Department of Intelligent Technologies.

Holnicki-Szulc's research interest lies in structural mechanics, optimal design, and material science. He has over 200 publications to his name, including book chapters, refereed journal articles, and authored books like Virtual Distortion Method and Structural Analysis, Design, and Control, as well as edited works such as Smart Structures and Smart Technologies for Safety Engineering. He received the Kobori Prize and was honored as a Director's Awards 2nd Degree Winner.

== Education ==
Holnicki-Szulc earned his M.Sc. in Engineering from the Warsaw University of Technology in 1969, followed by an M.Sc. in Mathematics from the University of Warsaw in 1972. He completed his Ph.D. in Technical Sciences at IPPT-PAN in 1973 and obtained his Habilitation degree in 1983.

== Career ==
Holnicki-Szulc started serving as an assistant professor in 1973 at IPPT-PAN. He held research positions at the University of Michigan in 1978 and Lehigh University in 1981 and later served as an associate professor from 1983 to 1999, also holding the appointment of Research Specialist at Virginia Polytechnic Institute in 1988 and Northwestern University in 1986. Since 1999, he has held the position of Professor at IPPT-PAN, where he leads the Division of Safety Engineering (Smart-Tech Centre) and the Department of Intelligent Technologies.

Holnicki-Szulc has led research projects in space technology and energy production. As project coordinator, he oversaw the EU Project ADLAND (2008–2010), and EU Marie Curie Project SMART-NEST (2011–2015), focusing on adaptive shock absorbers for aircraft landing gears. Among national projects, he coordinated SMART and SAFE (2008–2012), and AIA Polish (2013–2016), which developed methods and tools for health monitoring, adaptive design, and vibration control.

== Works ==
Holnicki-Szulc explored the concept of virtual distortions as a computational tool for analyzing structural problems caused by incompatible deformations in his 1991 book, Virtual Distortion Method. In 1995, he co-authored Structural Analysis, Design, and Control by the Virtual Distortion Method with Jacek T. Gierlinski, introducing the Virtual Distortion Method (VDM) and its applications in structural analysis and design, providing theoretical foundations on how VDM facilitates efficient computational methods.

Holnicki-Szulc, in collaboration with José Rodellar, edited Smart Structures, which delved into advancements in fundamental research, intelligent monitoring for structural identification, and damage assessment. He alongside Carlos Mota Soares, compiled invited lectures from the AMAS & ECCOMAS Workshop/Thematic Conference SMART'03 on smart materials and structures in the publication Advances in Smart Technologies in Structural Engineering. Tracy Kijewski-Correa in her review praised the book saying "this book emphasizes the unique and promising solutions to societal problems." In the 2008 book Smart Technologies for Safety Engineering, he presented a decade's worth of research from the Smart-Tech Centre, highlighting interdisciplinary applications like intelligent structures, adaptive materials, and control systems.

== Research ==
Holnicki-Szulc has focused his research on creating adaptive impact absorption, virtual distortion methods, and innovative designs such as motor less landing capsules and adaptive landing gears. He has supervised 18 PhD students.

Holnicki-Szulc developed the Virtual Distortion Method (VDM) in the early eighties, highlighting its effectiveness as a numerical tool for rapid structural reanalysis across various engineering domains. Inspired by the theory of elastic distortions, which models dislocations within an elastic continuum, this method enabled swift reanalysis in structural optimization. The initial applications of his VDM method spanned diverse areas, including modeling elastic-plastic progressive collapse using a linear system formulation and representing physical nonlinearities through virtual distortions. Later, his focus shifted to Structural Health Monitoring (SHM) issues with a specific focus on applying the VDM technique to address the inverse problem of damage identification. Additionally, the need for developing "smart" techniques for Adaptive Impact Absorption (AIA) emerged from his product-oriented "Copernicus" projects. This led him to explore new techniques for impact load identification, both online and offline, essential for AIA applications and addressing black-box engineering problems.

Holnicki-Szulc and his research group, Smart-Tech, delved in the challenging domain of AIA requiring multidisciplinary skills in mechanics, control, material science, electronics, optics, and informatics. He alongside this group, played a role in organizing the ECCOMAS Thematic Conference on Smart Structures and Materials, held biennially since September 2003 in Jadwisin, Poland. They developed Smart Technology Expert Courses and identified a new research field, stratospheric engineering, focusing on innovative helium-filled aerostats with adaptive morphing properties since 2014.

Holnicki-Szulc introduced a design concept for adaptive materials comprising elements with controllable yield stresses showcasing numerical simulations of their adaptation to various impact scenarios. Collaborating with Grzegorz M. Mikułowski, he introduced an integrated feedback control concept for adaptive landing gears, addressing limitations of classical designs by proposing a system to adjust damping force based on sink speed. His development of a motorless landing capsule, integrating a rotor and adjustable landing gear to ensure secure landings of fragile cargo, resulted in an approved patent for enhancing stability during cargo descent. Furthermore, he engineered a mobile capsule with a docking connector, optimizing helium gas replenishment for tethered helium kites mid-flight, facilitated by a regulated sliding shut-off valve for precise gas flow control.

== Awards and honors ==
- 2014 – Kobori Prize, International Association for Structural Control and Monitoring
- 2019 – Director's Awards 2nd Degree Winner, IPPT PAN

== Bibliography ==
=== Selected books ===
- Virtual Distortion Method (1991) ISBN 978-3540537793
- Structural Analysis, Design and Control by the Virtual Distortion Method (1995) ISBN 978-0471956563
- Smart Structures: Requirements and Potential Applications in Mechanical and Civil Engineering (1999) ISBN 978-0792356127
- Advances in Smart Technologies in Structural Engineering (2004) ISBN 978-3642061042
- Smart Technologies for Safety Engineering (2008) ISBN 978-0470058466

=== Selected articles ===
- Holnicki‐Szulc, J., & Gierlinski, J. T. (1989). Structural modifications simulated by virtual distortions. International journal for numerical methods in engineering, 28(3), 645–666.
- Holnicki-Szulc, J., Pawlowski, P., & Wiklo, M. (2003). High-performance impact absorbing materials—the concept, design tools and applications. Smart Materials and Structures, 12(3), 461.
- Mikułowski, G. M., & Holnicki-Szulc, J. (2007). Adaptive landing gear concept—feedback control validation. Smart Materials and Structures, 16(6), 2146.
- Kołakowski, P., Wikło, M., & Holnicki-Szulc, J. (2008). The virtual distortion method—a versatile reanalysis tool for structures and systems. Structural and Multidisciplinary Optimization, 36, 217–234.
- Basu, B., Bursi, O. S., Casciati, F., Casciati, S., Del Grosso, A. E., Domaneschi, M., ... & Rodellar, J. (2014). A European Association for the Control of Structures joint perspective. Recent studies in civil structural control across Europe. Structural Control and Health Monitoring, 21(12), 1414–1436.
