= Wojciech Borzuchowski =

Polish politician (born 1961)

Wojciech Borzuchowski (born 10 November 1961 in Wysokie Mazowieckie) is a Polish politician, a member of Law and Justice party until 2007, when he joined the Polish People's Party. He was elected to Sejm on 25 September 2001 and served until 2005.
