= Mlekovita =

Polish dairy products company

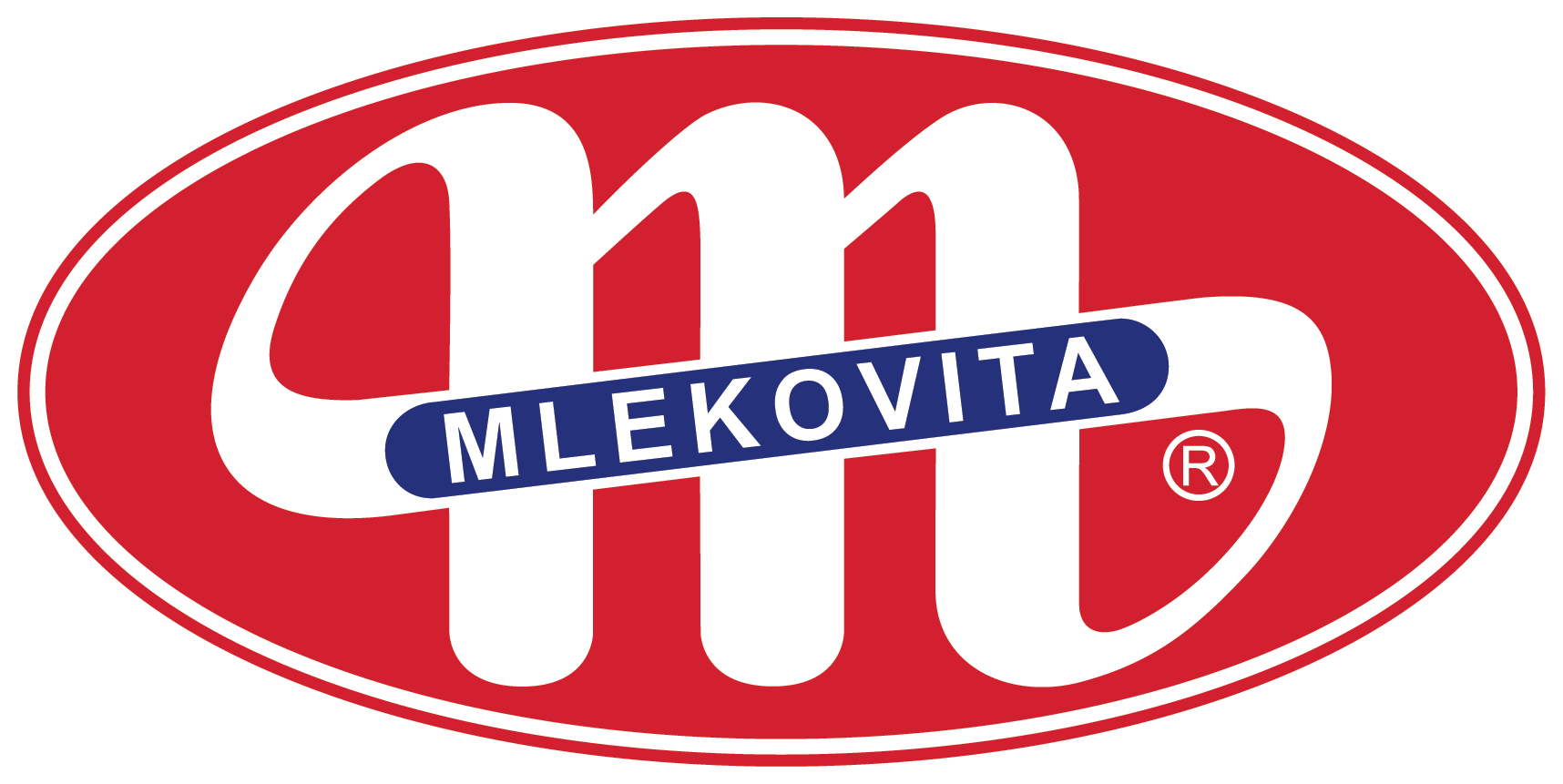
- Company type: Cooperative
- Founded: 2001
- Headquarters: Wysokie Mazowieckie, Podlaskie Voivodeship, Poland
- Products: Dairy
- Revenue: 1,086,000,000 euro (2018)
- Net income: 3,000,000 euro (2018)
- Number of employees: 3961 employees
- Website: www.mlekovita.com.pl

Mlekovita is a dairy products company based in Wysokie Mazowieckie, Poland. The company's slogan is "Twoja Mleczna Droga Do Radości!" (Your Milky Way To Happiness)

== History ==
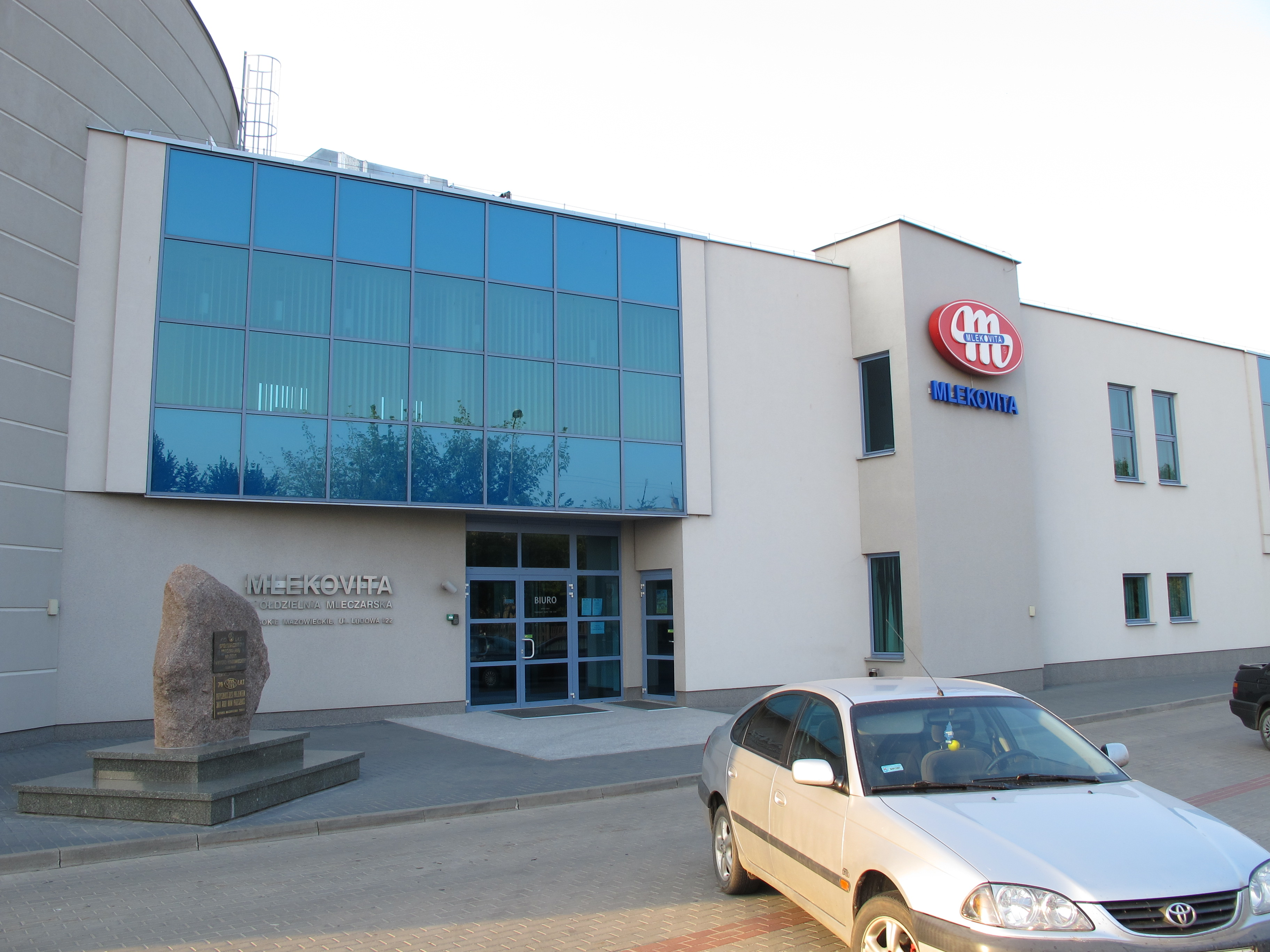
The company building in Wysokie Mazowieckie.

The Spółdzielnia Mleczarska Mlekovita dates back to the pre-First World War period. The establishment in Wysokie Mazowieckie was founded in 1928, and recruited around 30 people and produced cheese and butter. After the Second World War, the Delegatura Centrali Mleczarsko-Jajczarskich was founded and after three years the Powiatowy Zakład Mleczarski began also producing smetana, quark and ice cream. In 1957 in Wysokie Mazowieckie the Okręgowa Spółdzielnia Mleczarska was founded. At that time the new production manufacturing company have been built, which was open in 1962, which was used for cheese making, butter, machinery, milk keeping and apparatus.

=== Capital Group ===
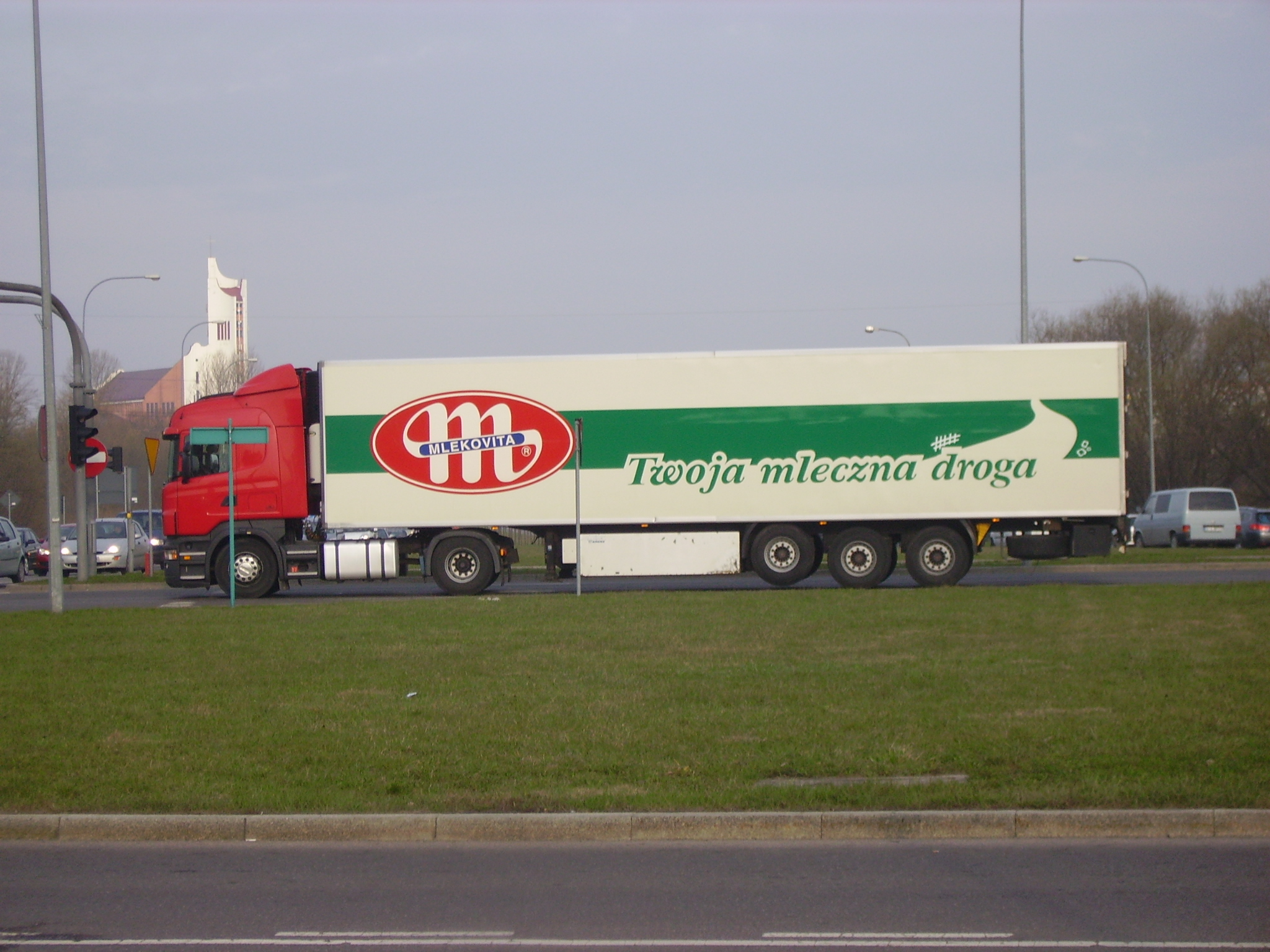
Truck with the logo of Mlekovita.

The capital group Mlekovita was founded on the 1 March 2014 by 14 companies with distribution centres in: with the base in Wysokie Mazowieckie and Baranowo, Biała Podlaska, Bielsk Podlaski, Brzesko, Chrzanów, Działdowo, Goręczyno, Kluczbork, Kościan, Lubawa, Łódź, Morąg, Pilica, Pyrzyce, Sanok, Susz, Toruń, Trzebownisko, Warsaw, Wolsztyn, Wyszków and Zakopane.

Mlekovita is the second largest dairy product producer in Poland, after Mlekpol in Grajewo. Around 35% of the production is exported, the company is able to produce through 3.0 million litres of milk daily.

Mlekovita is the organiser of the National Milk Day in Poland.

As of March 2014 the Okręgowa Spółdzielnia Mleczarska in Sanok joined the company, this was done to protect the business from the competition.
