= Faculty of Management of Warsaw University of Technology =

Business school at the Warsaw University of Technology

Coordinates: 52°12′11″N 21°00′09″E

Faculty of Management at the Warsaw University of Technology
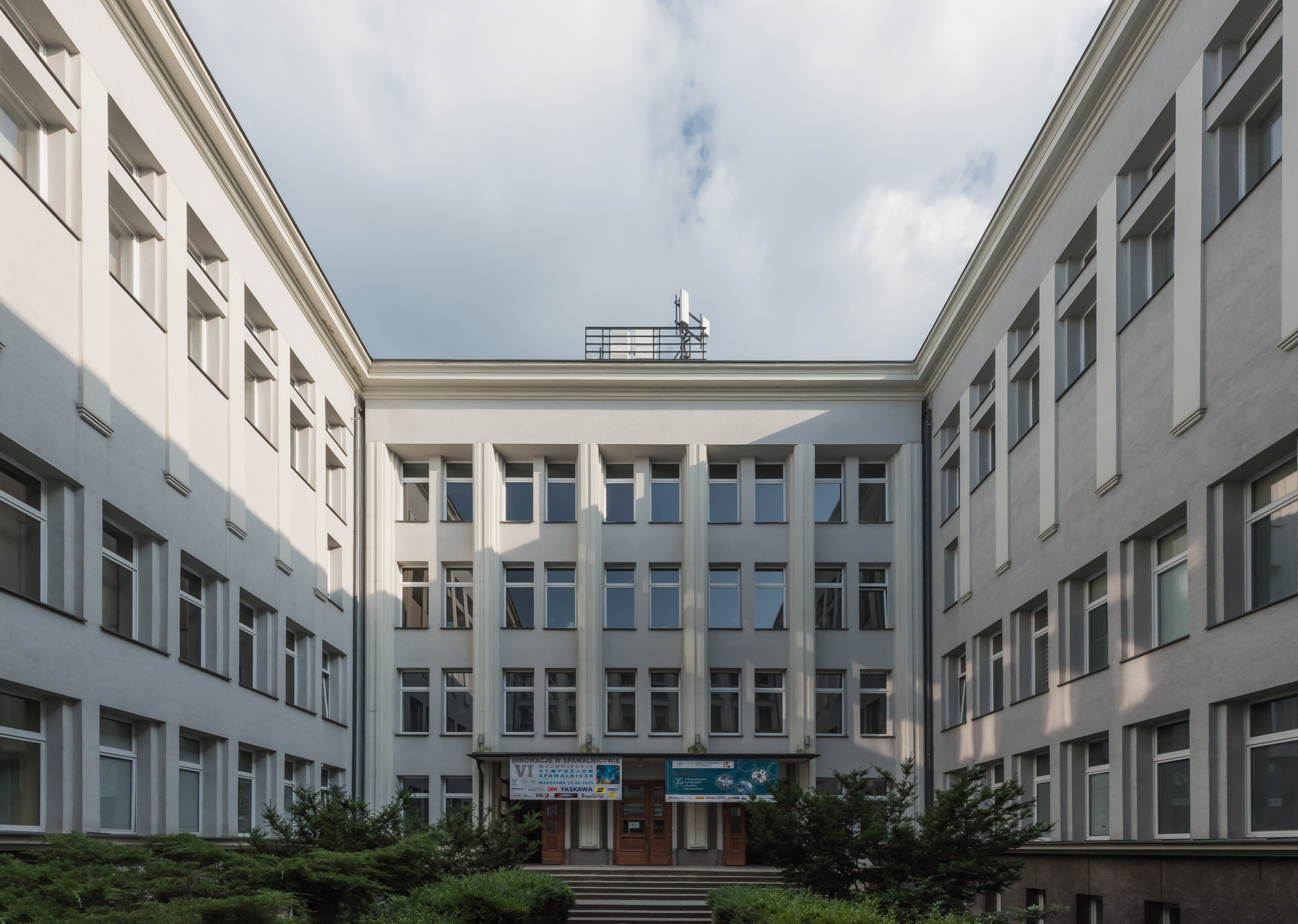
- Former names: Department of Work Organization Principles of Industrial Enterprise (1922–1953); Department of Engineering and Economics (1953–1970); Institute of Management Organization (1970–1985); Institute of Organization of Production Systems (1985–2008)
- Type: Public business school
- Established: 2008
- Parent institution: Warsaw University of Technology
- Accreditation: EFMD
- Dean: Agnieszka Bitkowska
- Location: Warsaw, Poland
- Website: www.wz.pw.edu.pl

The Faculty of Management at the Warsaw University of Technology (pl.: Wydział Zarządzania Politechniki Warszawskiej, WZ) is a business school in Warsaw, Poland.

The Faculty of Management traces its origins back to 1922 with a history in the field of management science. It has evolved with the changing conditions in Polish industry and society, adapting to educate managers and conducting research meeting international standards.

Its facilities are located on the southern side of the Warsaw University of Technology campus in the New Technology Building at 85 Ludwika Narbutta Street in the Mokotów neighborhood.

== History ==
The roots of the current Faculty of Management date back to 1922, when Karol Adamiecki established the Department of Work Organization Principles of Industrial Enterprises at the Warsaw University of Technology. Adamiecki, a pioneer in scientific management, laid the foundations for what would become a cornerstone of management education in Poland. It was also one of the first such academic departments in the world.

The legacy of Adamiecki's department was continued with the establishment of the Department of Engineering and Economics in 1953, situated within the Faculty of Mechanical Engineering (now known as the Faculty of Production Engineering or the Faculty of Mechanical and Industrial Engineering). This integration underscored the interdisciplinary nature of management, combining technical expertise with economic principles.

Further consolidation occurred in 1970 with the merger of the Engineering and Economic Department and the Department of Economics and Production Organization from the Faculty of Precision Mechanics (now the Faculty of Mechatronics). This fusion led to the creation of the Institute of Management Organization. This was renamed in 1985 to the Institute of Organization of Production Systems, reflecting an evolving focus on systemic approaches to production management.

Finally, the independent Faculty of Management was formally established in 2008. It consolidated the resources and expertise within this Institute (which was then part of the Faculty of Production Engineering). This reorganization also established management studies as a dedicated academic unit within the university structure.

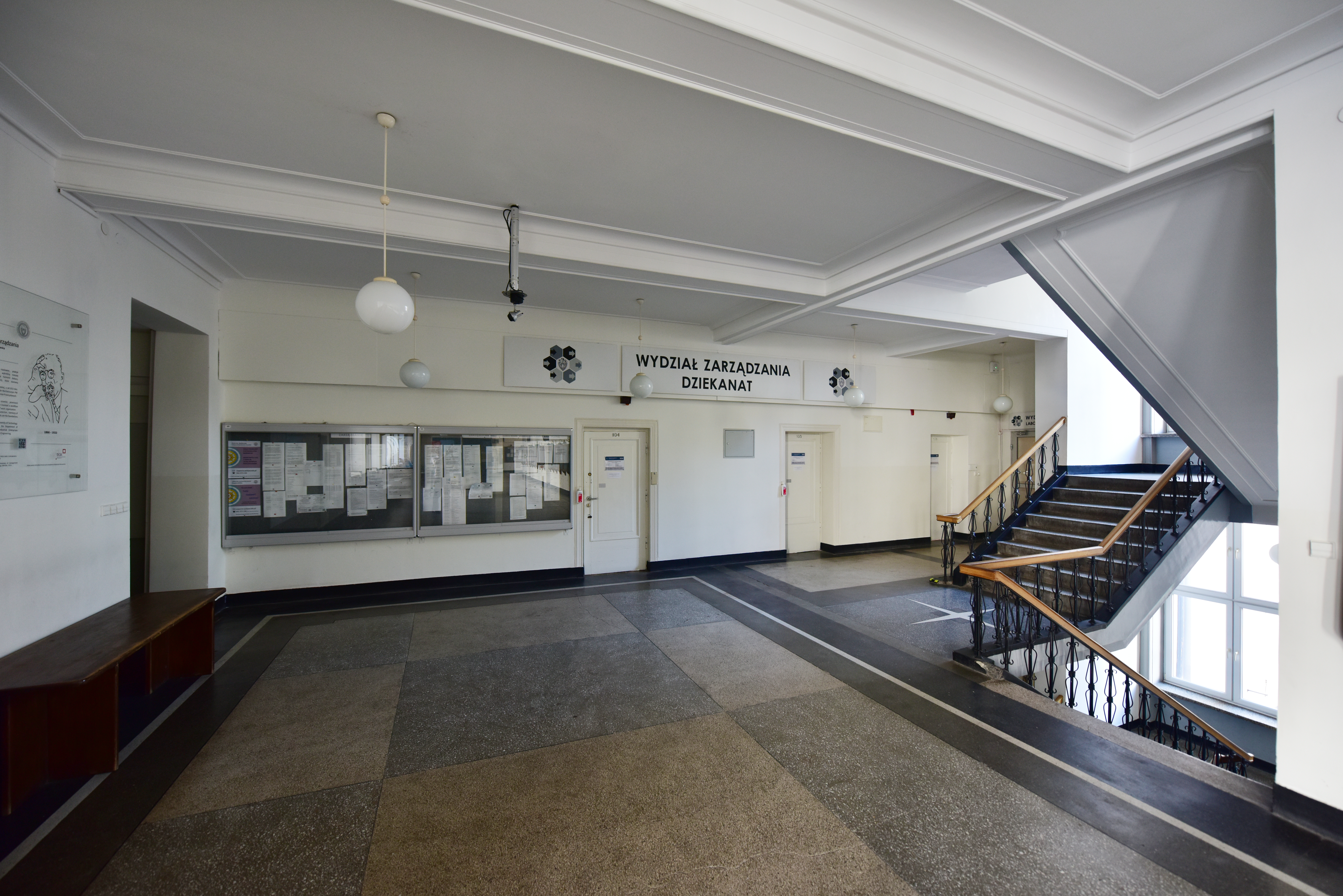
Faculty of Management office

== Mission ==
The core mission of the Faculty of Management is multifaceted.

- To educate highly skilled specialists in the management field, preparing them for the demands of the knowledge economy and information society at the highest level of excellence.
- To strengthen the Faculty's position through rigorous scientific research.
- To foster robust cooperation with the business environment within Poland and globally.
- To consistently develop the competencies of its academic and administrative staff.

== Research Focus ==
The Faculty's main scope of research is broad and interdisciplinary, encompassing critical areas of modern management.

- Organizational Operations - In-depth study, evaluation, and improvement of the operations of diverse business organizations and public institutions, including advanced modeling and empirical management aspects.
- Information Technology in Management - Research, development, and application of cutting-edge IT tools in management, with a particular focus on decision-facilitating systems and decision analysis, often incorporating artificial intelligence.
- Economic and Social Process Modeling - Study and modeling of complex economic and social processes and phenomena, particularly in the context of optimizing management decisions through simulation and econometric modeling, and robust risk management strategies.
- Organizational and Consumer Behavior - Comprehensive study of the conditions influencing organizational and consumer behavior across various management levels.
- Logistics and Production Environments - Analysis and evaluation of logistics and production environments within companies and the broader economy, including the modeling of production processes with an emphasis on ergonomics, industrial safety, and environmental protection.
- Innovation and Knowledge Management - Study and modeling of economic and social phenomena related to innovation management, knowledge and technology transfer, and the development of new products and companies.

== Accreditation ==
The Faculty of Management is accredited by the European Foundation for Management Development (EFMD) for its Executive MBA program specifically holding the EPAS accreditation.

== Degrees and concentrations ==
Bachelor's degree

- Management (BA) – with a concentration in:

Production management
Technology transfer and innovation management
Quality management
Ergonomics and the work environment
Business management
Finance and risk management
Business informatics

- Production Engineering and Management (engineer) – with a concentration in:

Production management
Information management systems
Technology transfer and innovation management

Master's degree (or a Master of Science)

- Management (MA) – with a concentration in:

Enterprise in an integrated Europe
Production in international markets
Digital economy

== Organization ==
Faculty of Management units and their main research areas:

- Division of Organization Strategic Development (ZRWZ)

strategic management
marketing management
human capital management
organization management in the era of digital transformation

- Division of Entrepreneurship and Innovation (ZIWZ).

innovation management
entrepreneurship

- Division of Finance (ZFWZ)

finance management
the financial system
digital finance

- Division of Production, Process and Project Management (ZPWZ)

production management
logistics management
project management
process management

- Division of Intelligent Systems (ZSWZ)

application of machine learning and artificial intelligence in business
technological aspects of knowledge management
development and implementation of information systems
modeling of intelligent systems
organizational and managerial support for digital transformation processes

- Division of Public Management (ZZWZ)

public management, especially public crisis management
social logistics, especially smart-city and smart-community
management of the health care system
management of the higher education and science system
