= Warsaw University of Technology =

Technical university in Warsaw, Poland

- Politechnika Warszawska
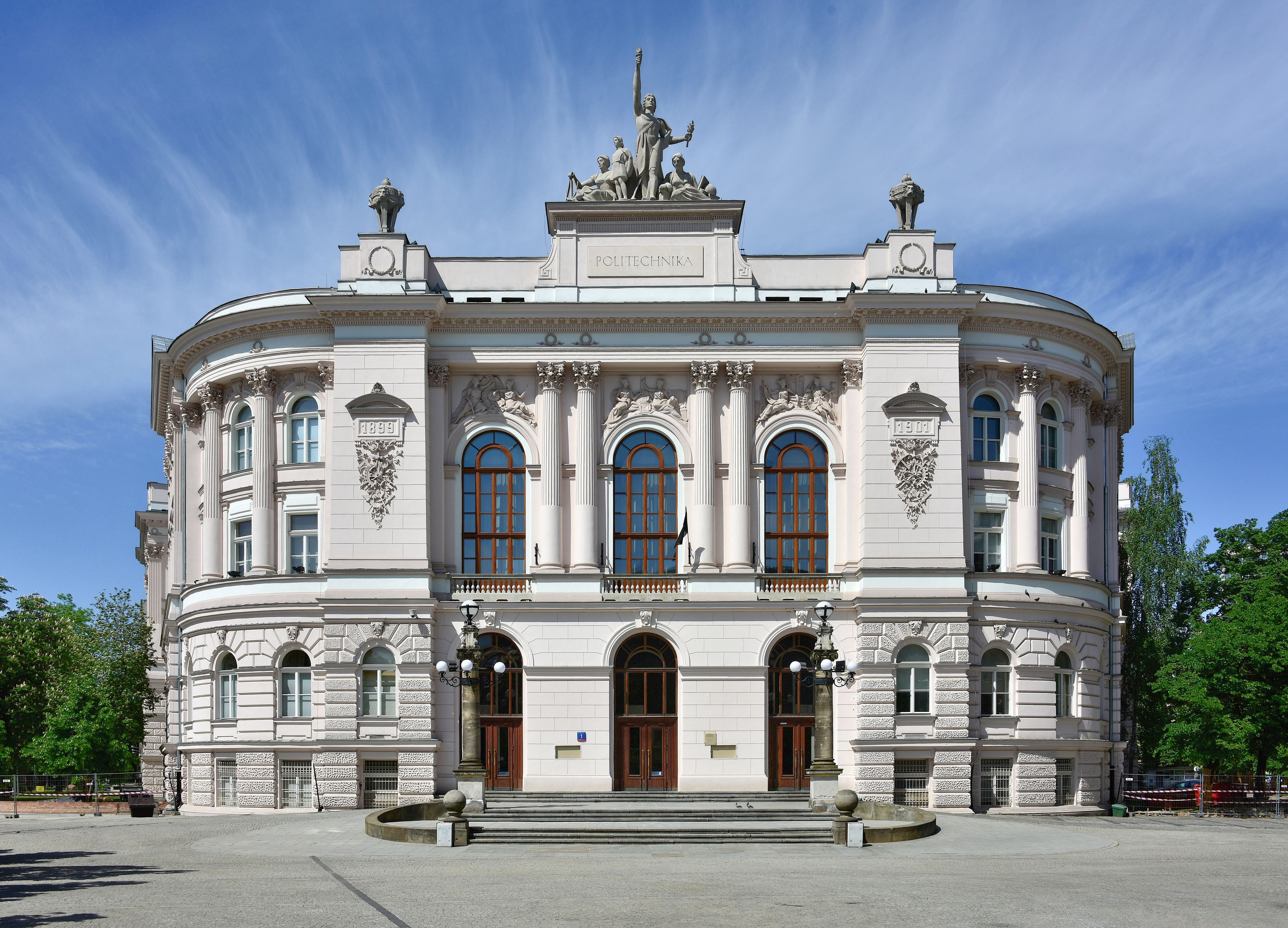
- Latin: Polytechnica Varsoviensis
- Type: Public
- Established: 1826; 200 years ago
- Affiliations: EUA, EucA, PEGASUS, CESAER, BEST
- Rector: Krzysztof Zaremba
- Faculty: 2,553
- Students: 20,953 (12.2025)
- Undergraduates: 15,232
- Postgraduates: 1,732
- Location: pl. Politechniki 1, 00-661, Warsaw, Poland; 52°13′13″N 21°0′38″E
- Website: www.pw.edu.pl
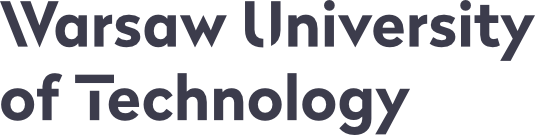

Warsaw University of Technology (Polish: Politechnika Warszawska, lit. 'Varsovian Polytechnic', PW) is one of the leading institutes of technology in Poland and one of the largest Universities in Central Europe. It employs 2,553 teaching faculty, including 262 titular professors. Its 19 faculties (divisions) covering almost all fields of science and technology are located in Warsaw, except for one, which is in Płock.

The origins of Warsaw University of Technology date back to 1826, when engineering education began at the Warsaw Institute of Technology.

Warsaw University of Technology (often referred to as Warsaw Tech) has 20,953 students (as of 2025), mostly full-time. It has about 5,000 graduates per year.

According to the 2008 Rzeczpospolita newspaper survey, engineers govern Polish companies. Warsaw Tech alumni make up the highest percentage of Polish managers and executives. Every ninth president among the top 500 corporations in Poland is a graduate of Warsaw University of Technology. It provides a basis for the performance of managers by equipping students with an education at the highest level and preparing them with the tools and information, including knowledge of foreign languages.

In 2026, Times Higher Education ranked the university within the global 1201–1500 band.

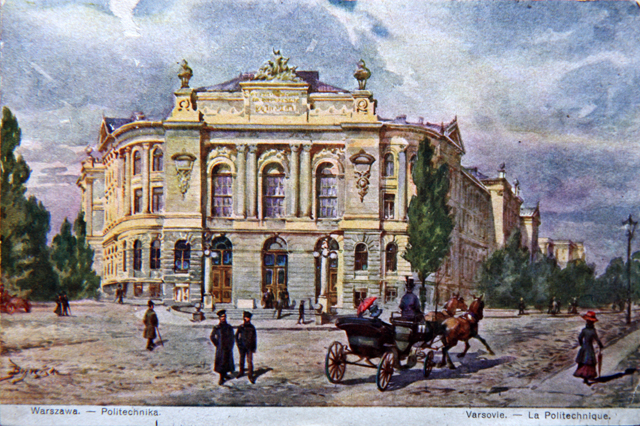
A postcard from the early 20th century

== History ==
Polish technical universities developed differently from modern universities. The Humboldtian model of higher education incorporated institutional autonomy to protect universities from the interference of external stakeholders, especially corporate actors. Technical institutions of various post-secondary status were closer to industry as a consequence of economic growth and industrial development. There was growing demand for highly trained specialists in engineering.

=== 1826–1831 ===
The origins of Polish universities of technology go back to the 18th century. They were related to either military technology or mining. For example, the extraction of coal requires complex technological processes to exploit deeper seams.

The model school of technology, a university of technology, was designed by the French, who in 1794 founded the Ecole polytechnique in Paris. At the beginning of the 19th century, technical universities were established in Prague (in 1806), Vienna (1815), and Karlsruhe (1824).

In Poland, the first multidisciplinary university of technology was the Preparatory School for the Institute of Technology, which opened on 4 January 1826. The Warsaw University of Technology still cultivates its traditions. The person who played the most important part in creating the school and writing its charter was Stanisław Staszic. Kajetan Garbiński, a mathematician and professor at Warsaw University, became the director. The school was based at the University of Warsaw, and its ceremonial inauguration took place there on January 4, 1826, in the Casimir Palace. Initially, it offered two courses: an introductory one and an advanced one. The school was closed in 1831, after the November Insurrection.

=== 1898–1914 ===
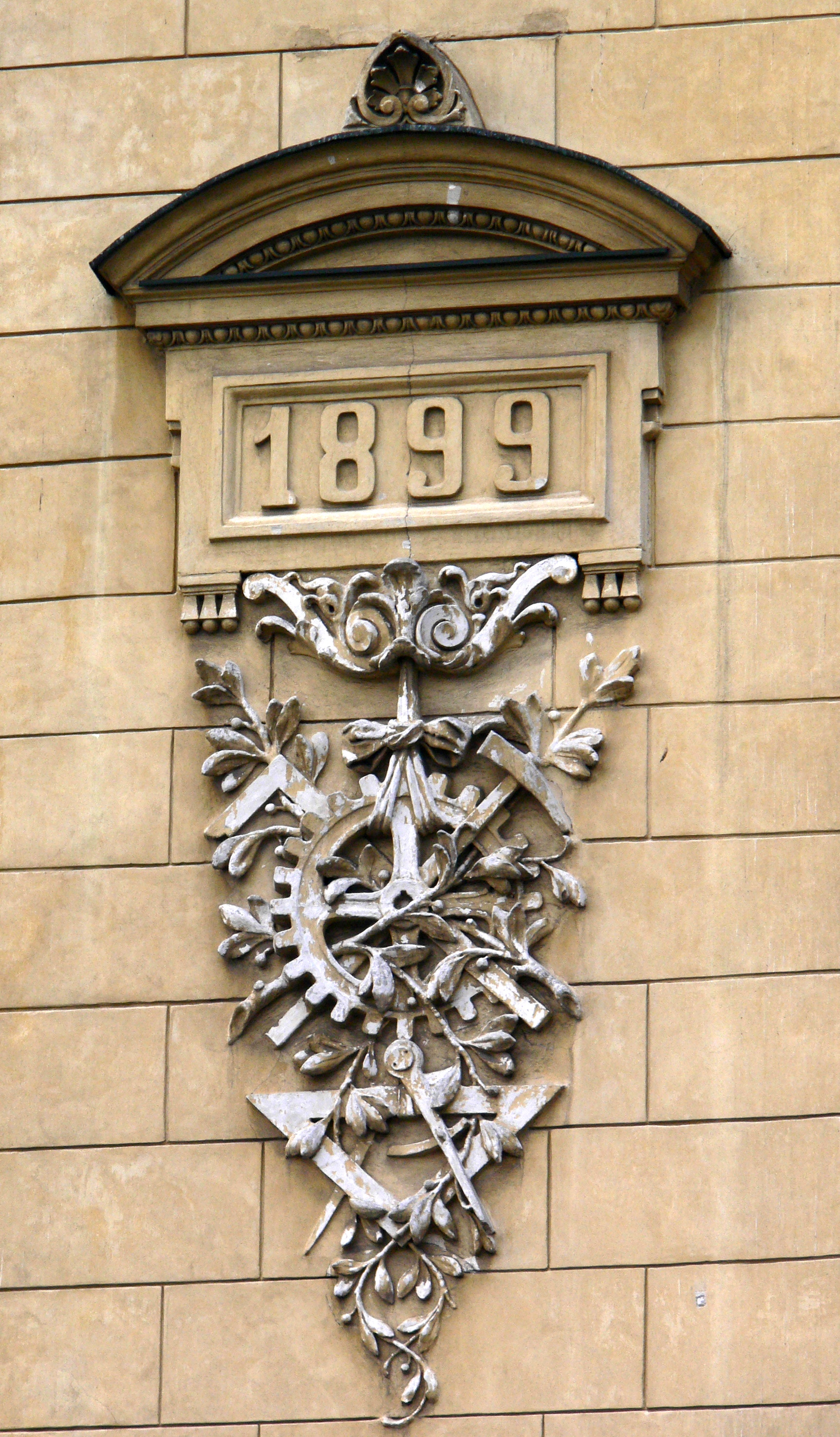
Founding date

In 1898, the Technological Section of the Warsaw Society for Russian Commerce and Industry, under the direction of engineer Kazimierz Obrębowicz, raised one million rubles to establish the Emperor Nicholas II Warsaw Polytechnic Institute. Classes, with Russian as the language of instruction, started on 5 September in the building at 81 Marszałkowska Street. They were soon moved to new buildings, built especially for the Institute. Bronisław Rogóyski and Stefan Szyller designed them. The City Administration donated a site of approximately 7 hectares—formerly occupied by the 1896 Hygiene Exhibition and located at the intersection of Polna and Nowowiejska Streets—for the construction of the Institute's headquarters.

In 1905, the Institute’s operations were suspended indefinitely due to student protests demanding the overthrow of the tsarist regime and the adoption of Polish as the medium of instruction. It reopened in the autumn of 1908, retaining Russian as the medium of instruction. At the same time, Włodzimierz Amalicki was appointed to replace the dismissed director of the Institute, Aleksander Lagioro, and was given the title of rector.

On the day of its opening, the university had three faculties: Mathematics, Chemistry, as well as Engineering and Construction. In June 1902, the Faculty of Mining was opened. Poles constituted the majority of students until 1905, when their number reached 1,100.

Main Building of Warsaw University of Technology, c. 1918

During World War I, amidst the mass exodus of the population, and acting on the orders of Rector Włodzimierz Amalicki, the Institute—along with its equipment and academic staff—was evacuated in June 1915 to the interior of the Russian Empire. It was moved first to Moscow, then to Rostov-on-Don, and finally to Nizhny Novgorod, where the majority of the Institute's personnel and movable assets arrived. This enabled the establishment of a polytechnic institute in that city. On June 17, 1917, the Russian Provisional Government issued a decree closing the Polytechnic Institute.

=== 1915–1939 ===
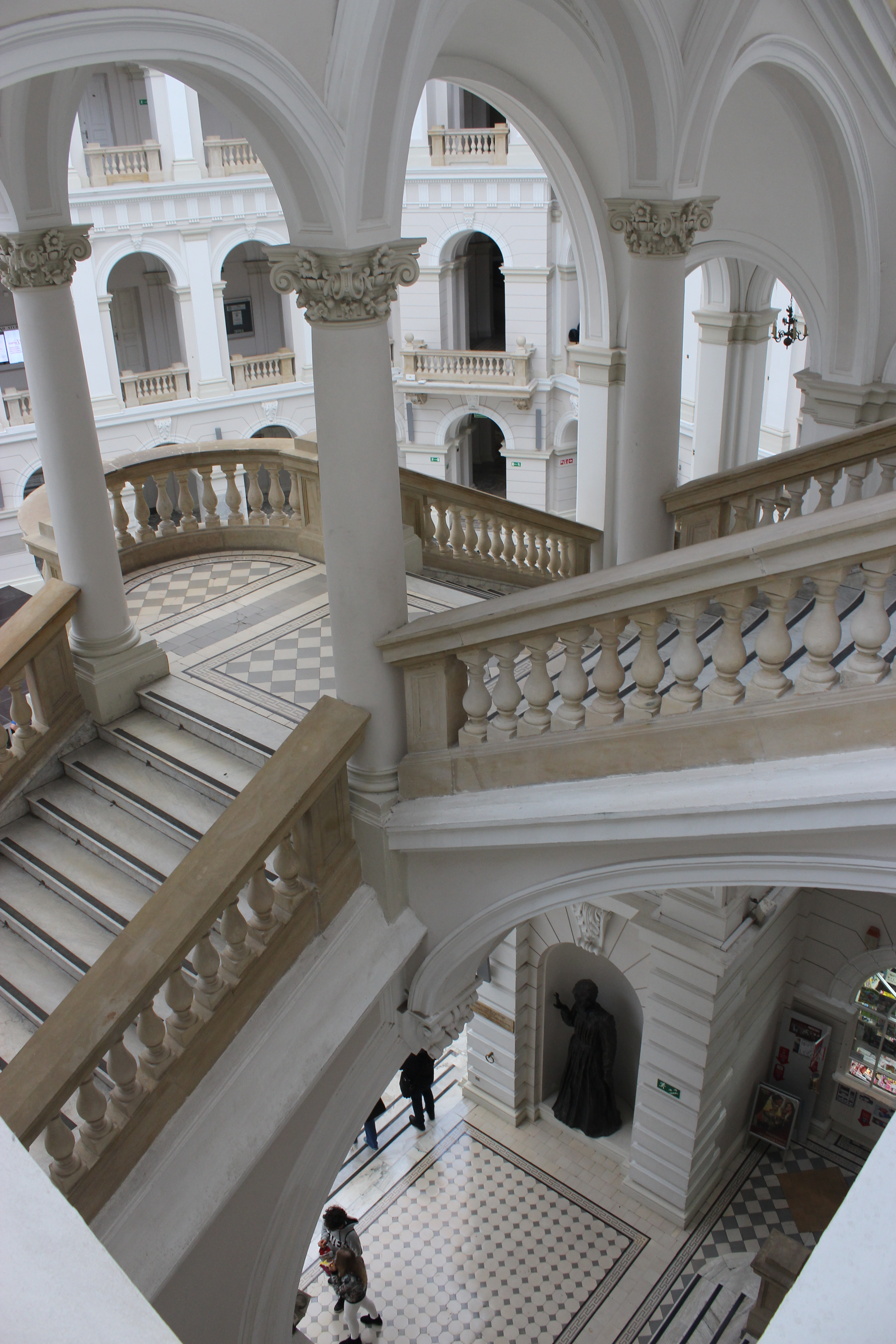
Staircases in the Main Auditorium

After German troops entered Warsaw on 5 August 1915, they sought to gain the sympathy of Poles. They allowed the University of Warsaw and the Warsaw University of Technology to open with Polish as the language of instruction. The grand opening of both universities was held on 15 November 1915. Zygmunt Straszewicz was the first rector of the Warsaw University of Technology. World War I, along with the events surrounding the restoration of the Polish State and the Polish-Bolshevik war, did not aid the school's development. Daily lectures finally started in November 1920. The school included the faculties of Mechanics, Electrical Engineering, Chemistry, Architecture, Civil Engineering, Aquatic Engineering, and Geodesy (Measurement since 1925). The last three faculties were merged under the new Academic Schools Law of 13 March 1933. The Polish Cabinet issued a decree on 25 September 1933 establishing the new Faculty of Engineering.

The number of students at the Warsaw University of Technology over the twenty years between the wars grew from 2,540 in the 1918/1919 academic year to 4,673 just before the outbreak of World War II. In the same period, the school granted more than 6,200 diplomas, including 320 for women. The Warsaw University of Technology became the most important engineering research center in Poland and gained international prestige. At that time, 66 graduates earned Doctor of Philosophy degrees, degrees, and 50 qualified for assistant professor positions. The university was a centre of scientific research for people whose achievements were fundamental to world science and technology, including Karol Adamiecki, Stefan Bryła, Jan Czochralski, Tytus Maksymilian Huber, Janusz Groszkowski, Mieczysław Wolfke, and others.

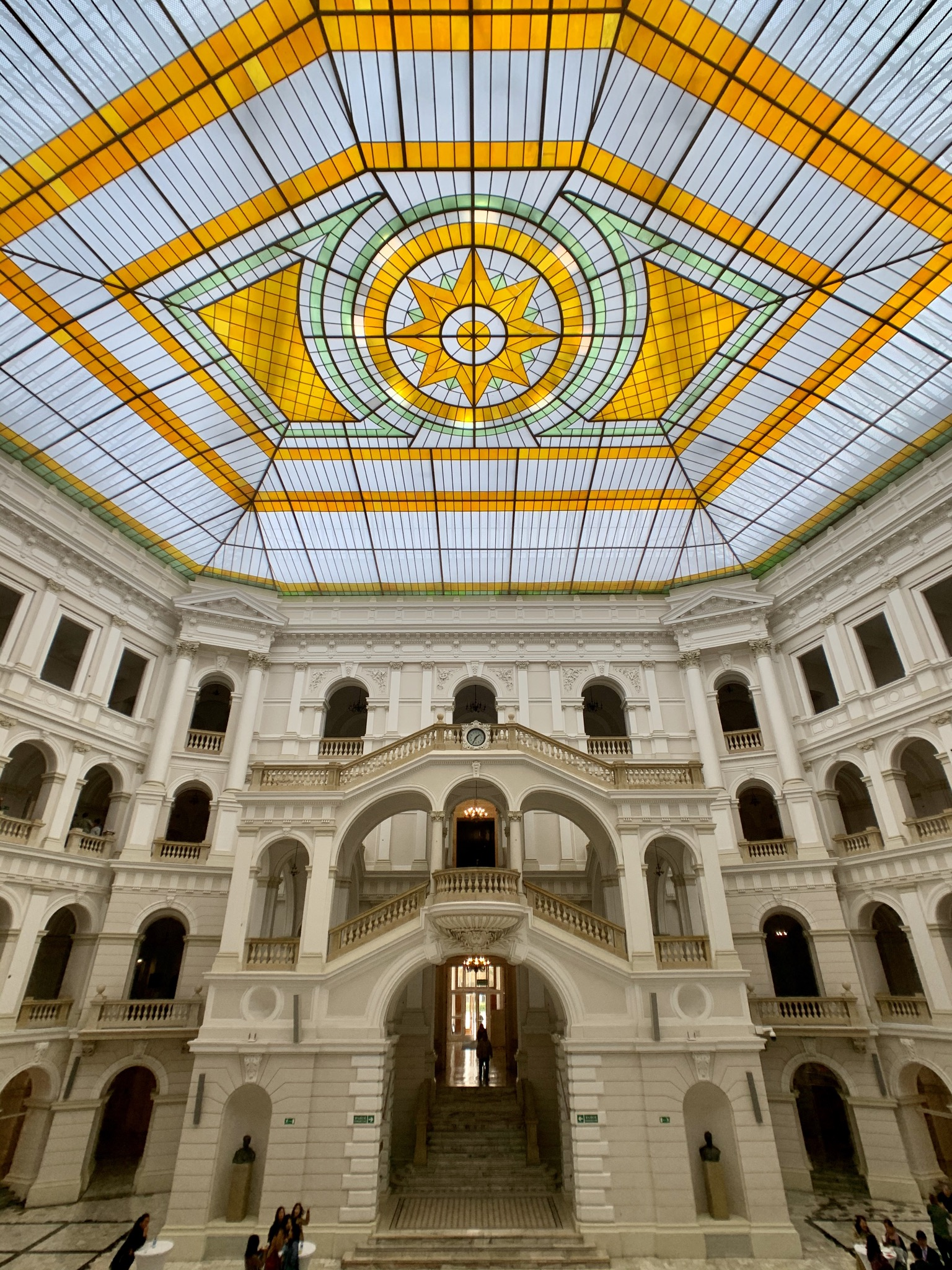
The Main Auditorium

=== 1939–1945 ===
During World War II, despite enormous material losses and repressive measures, the Warsaw University of Technology continued to operate underground. Teaching continued in clandestine and open courses, in vocational schools, and from 1942, in a two-year State Higher Technical School. Approximately 3,000 students participated in the clandestine courses, and 198 earned engineering diplomas. Scientific research was conducted, as 20 PhD and 14 assistant-professorship qualifying theses were written. Considerable work was devoted to the reconstruction of Poland after the war and constitutes the foundation for the development of science. Students and professors secretly worked on projects. Professors Janusz Groszkowski, Marceli Struszyński, and Józef Zawadzki conducted a detailed analysis of the radio and steering devices of the German V-2 rockets at the request of Polish Home Army Intelligence.

On the first day of the Warsaw Uprising, August 1, 1944, the university grounds were seized by insurgents from the "Golski" Battalion. The Germans launched unsuccessful attacks on Polish positions on August 3, 5, and 15. A full-scale assault on the University of Technology took place from several directions on August 19. After fierce fighting, the Poles were forced to retreat through a tunnel to the other side of Noakowskiego Street, which served as the frontline until the Uprising's capitulation. The insurgents also held the Faculty of Architecture building, which housed the "Golski" Battalion command and an insurgent hospital until the end of the Uprising.

=== 1945–present ===
University rankings

Global – Overall
- ARWU World: 901–1000 (2026)
- CWTS World: 584 (2025)
- QS World: =487 (2026)
- THE World: 1201–1500 (2026)

Regional – Overall
- QS Emerging Europe and Central Asia: 14 (2022)

After German troops were dislodged from Warsaw, classes started in improvised conditions on 22 January 1945. By the end of the year, all the pre-war faculties were reopened. Old, war-damaged buildings were quickly rebuilt; new ones were erected. In 1951, the Warsaw University of Technology incorporated the Wawelberg and Rotwand School of Engineering.

The Academic and Research Centre in Płock was created in 1967.

In 1945, there were 2,148 students in six faculties (divisions). By 1999, there were 22,000 students enrolled in 16 faculties. The Warsaw University of Technology awarded over 104,000 Bachelor of Science and Master of Science engineer degrees between the years 1945 and 1998.

The university serves as an important scientific center, educating academic staff for its own purposes and for other Polish schools of technology. Between 1945 and 1998, 5,500 PhD theses were written. Almost 1,100 qualified for assistant professorships. The number of academic staff grew significantly. In 1938, the university had 98 tenured professors and associate professors, as well as 307 assistant professors and teaching assistants; in 1948, there were 87 tenured professors and 471 associate professors, as well as 307 assistant professors and teaching assistants; while in 1999, there were 371 professors, 1,028 tutors, 512 lecturers, and 341 teaching assistants.

WUT Faculty of Mathematics and Information Science

WUT Faculty of Architecture

== Faculties ==
- Faculty of Administration and Social Science
- Faculty of Architecture
- Faculty of Automotive and Construction Machinery Engineering
- Faculty of Chemical and Process Engineering
- Faculty of Chemistry
- Faculty of Civil Engineering
- Faculty of Electrical Engineering
- Faculty of Electronics and Information Technology
- Faculty of Environmental Engineering
- Faculty of Geodesy and Cartography
- Faculty of Mathematics and Information Science
- Faculty of Management
- Faculty of Materials Science and Engineering
- Faculty of Mechanical and Industrial Engineering
- Faculty of Mechatronics
- Faculty of Physics
- Faculty of Power and Aeronautical Engineering
- Faculty of Transport
- WUT Business School

Płock Campus:

- Faculty of Civil Engineering, Mechanics and Petrochemistry
- College of Economics and Social Sciences

=== Transport ===
The transport faculty is engaged in research into the development of railway variable gauge axles which help overcome breaks of gauge, such as the SUW 2000 system and INTERGAUGE.

== Campuses ==
=== History ===
The history of the Warsaw University of Technology campus began between 1899 and 1901, when the construction of a complex of buildings for the Emperor Nicholas II Warsaw Polytechnic Institute commenced near what is now Polytechnic Square and the Noakowskiego and Nowowiejska Streets. The complex was erected on the site previously occupied by the 1896 Hygiene Exhibition. Other locations—such as the Praga Park and the grounds of St. Lazarus Hospital in the "Na Książęcem" garden—were also considered, but were ultimately deemed too far from the city center. The placement of the university buildings in this part of the city proved highly significant for Warsaw and its urban development; it increased the attractiveness and value of neighboring plots of land, accelerated their development, and fostered the city's expansion toward the south.

In the subsequent phase, following the selection of the site, architects Stefan Szyller and Bronisław Rogóyski were chosen to develop the design and oversee the construction process. Szyller undertook the design of the Main Building, as well as the physics and electrical engineering pavilion, while Rogóyski was responsible for the mechanical and chemical engineering buildings, along with residential quarters for faculty and administrative staff. Lacking prior experience with projects of this nature, they embarked on a multi-week journey across Europe after completing their initial sketches, aiming to study other technical universities and the architectural solutions employed there. Broadening their perspective was essential, given the emerging late-19th-century standards for the design of buildings or complexes intended for higher technical education. Most such projects were based on a design by Ludwig Klasen, presented in his 1872 publication on architecture, which served as a benchmark at the time.

The initial plan was to design facilities capable of accommodating one thousand students across four departments: Chemistry, Mechanical Engineering, and Civil Engineering—with the addition of a Mining and Metallurgical Engineering department in 1903. As the institution grew and the student population increased—leading, for instance, to overcrowding—additional buildings were constructed, and the campus grounds expanded, extending well beyond the original site and incorporating new areas of Warsaw. Since the construction of its first edifices, the university has undergone periodic expansion and continuous modernization. Especially in the post-war period, the university underwent a long and consistent reconstruction process—despite difficult conditions, material shortages, and a lack of personnel (approximately 50% of the university’s buildings had been destroyed during the Warsaw Uprising). This effort involved students, staff, and residents of the capital, with support from the city authorities. In 1947, a decision was made to restore the Main Building, while also constructing its left wing (facing Nowowiejska Street)—a feature originally included in Stefan Szyller’s late 19th-century design. Due to financial constraints, gaps in documentation, and a lack of source materials, most of the buildings were reconstructed or modernized in ways that departed from their pre-war state. In 1951, the Mechanical and Technical School of H. Wawelberg and S. Rotwand was incorporated into the Warsaw University of Technology. This development led to a significant increase in the number of full-time students and expanded the university’s total building volume by nearly 87,000 m³. By the end of the 1950s, this provided the impetus for the university to expand beyond its central campus and develop facilities in the Mokotów Field area. The 1960s and 1970s marked the most significant period of urban development for the university. A particularly notable milestone was the establishment of a branch of the Warsaw University of Technology in Płock in 1967. The 1990s saw an intensive wave of modernization and renovation across most WUT buildings, which had fallen into disrepair during the Polish People's Republic era due to a persistent lack of funding. Both the structures themselves and their internal equipment were described as worn-out and obsolete. By 2024, a significant portion of these buildings had been renovated, restored, and—depending on specific requirements—upgraded with new equipment.

=== Central Campus ===
The Central Campus, the oldest of the university’s sites, is located in the southern part of the Śródmieście district, bounded by Independence Avenue, Armii Ludowej Avenue, and the Polna, Noakowskiego, and Koszykowa Streets. The Main Building, situated at Polytechnic Square, houses the faculties of Administration and Social Sciences, Electrical Engineering, and Geodesy and Cartography. Nearby are the buildings for the faculties of Chemistry, Electronics and Information Technology, Physics, Civil Engineering, Environmental Engineering, Mathematics and Information Science, Power and Aeronautical Engineering, and Transport. The faculties of Architecture and of Chemical and Process Engineering are also located in the vicinity.

=== Southern Campus ===
The Southern Campus, situated in the Mokotów district, houses the following faculties: Management, Mechanical Engineering and Manufacturing, Automotive and Construction Machinery Engineering, Mechatronics, and Materials Science and Engineering.

=== Płock Campus ===
The university also maintains a campus in Płock, which comprises the Faculty of Civil Engineering, Mechanics and Petrochemistry, and the College of Economic and Social Sciences.

=== Student accommodation ===
The campuses also include student accommodation. The university has 10 such residences (9 in Warsaw and 1 in Płock):

- "Akademik" Dormitory – 5 Akademicka Street
- "Babilon" Dormitory – 12/16 Kopińska Street
- "Bratniak–Muszelka" Dormitory – 39 Grójecka Street
- "Mikrus" Dormitory – 10 Waryńskiego Street
- "Pineska–Tulipan" Dormitory – 5 Uniwersytecka Street
- "Riviera" Dormitory – 12 Waryńskiego Street
- "Tatrzańska" Dormitory – 7 Tatrzańska Street
- "Ustronie" Dormitory – 39 Księcia Janusza Street
- "Wcześniak" Dormitory – 5 Dobrzyńska Street in Płock

== Accreditations ==
Certain degree programs offered at the Warsaw University of Technology hold international accreditations and certificates (as of 2024):

- SAS Institute – "SAS Academic Specialization" certification for first- and second-cycle degree programs in the following fields: Computer Science and Information Systems; Computer Engineering and Telecommunications; Data Engineering and Analysis; Mathematics; and Mathematics and Data Analysis.
- Partnership of a European Group of Aeronautics and Space Universities (PEGASUS) – for second-cycle degree programs in Aerospace Engineering (both in Polish and English).
- EUR-ACE label – for first- and second-cycle degree programs in: Automatics and Robotics; Biotechnology; Civil Engineering; Power Engineering; Geodesy and Cartography; Chemical and Process Engineering; Data Engineering and Analysis; Materials Science and Engineering; Aerospace Engineering; Mechanics and Machine Design; Chemical Technology; and Transport.
- International Project Management Association Poland – for the postgraduate program in Construction Management.
- Association of Chartered Certified Accountants – for postgraduate programs offered by the WUT Business School.

Furthermore, the WUT Foreign Language Centre has been granted accreditation by Eaquals, an organization for institutions involved in foreign language teaching.

== Libraries ==
The libraries of Warsaw University of Technology constitute the WUT Library System, which consists of the Main Library, branch libraries and specialist libraries located in faculties, institutes, chairs and other units. Collectively, the libraries hold over 1.5 million items in print (books, journals, special collections, etc.) and more than 300,000 publication titles available in electronic format.

== International cooperation ==
=== The post-war period ===
Following World War II, the international cooperation pursued by Warsaw University of Technology focused primarily on researchers and academic institutions within the Eastern Bloc. At the same time, inter-university ties with Western world were maintained—for instance, through the International Association for the Exchange of Students for Technical Experience (IAESTE) and scholarships provided by foreign organizations such as the Ford Foundation and the British Council. The expansion of the university’s organizational structure and the establishment of a Foreign Affairs Commission in 1957 led to an increase in international travel. The university participated in—and also hosted—international technical trade shows and exhibitions, including those held in Paris, Leipzig, and Moscow. In 1969–1970, the Faculty of Sanitary and Water Engineering launched the first international postgraduate program at WUT, focusing on sanitary engineering; the initiative was organized as part of a collaboration between the Polish government and the World Health Organization. The program was attended by students from Eastern Europe.

Due to internal tensions and the imposition of martial law in 1981–1982, both the travel of Polish students abroad and the arrival of international visitors in Poland were restricted. This particularly affected cooperation with the United States, which had been conducted under the auspices of the Maria Skłodowska-Curie Fund. In the 1980s, WUT was a member of six international organizations, including the International Organization of Experts, which operated under the United Nations Economic and Social Council.

=== Current era ===
Following the systemic transformation in Poland, the university’s leadership focused on fostering cooperation with the United States, Western Europe, and Asia, while simultaneously scaling back ties with Eastern European states. In the 1993/1994 academic year, the first two degree programs taught in English were launched to attract international students. By 2024, the university offered 12 undergraduate (first-cycle) and 21 graduate (second-cycle) degree programs in English. Today, the Warsaw University of Technology collaborates with foreign institutions on research, education, and international mobility, as well as in the areas of entrepreneurship, innovation, and professional development for staff. Since 2003, the university’s Centre for International Cooperation has served as the primary coordinator for these activities. The Project Support Centre provides administrative and organizational assistance, as well as support throughout the lifecycle—from acquisition to implementation and final reporting—of both domestic and international projects.

==== Participation in research ====
The university collaborates with CERN. Since 1994, it has been involved in work on the muon trigger for the Compact Muon Solenoid. A team of physicists and computer scientists from WUT participated in the international ALICE experiment at the Large Hadron Collider. In 2024, the team published the results of their research on particle identification in the "European Physical Journal C". At CERN, the Warsaw University of Technology also participates in the LHCb experiment.

WUT researchers are involved in the development of the Cherenkov Telescope Array Observatory as well as the construction of the European Spallation Source and the Facility for Antiproton and Ion Research. The university also collaborates with the DESY laboratory.

Academic staff from WUT have been awarded grants from the European Research Council, which fund research initiatives across all fields of knowledge. The first researcher from WUT to receive such a grant was Maciej Trusiak, in 2023.

==== Membership in international organizations ====
In 1988, WUT was among the 388 signatories of the Magna Charta Universitatum, signed in Bologna on the 900th anniversary of the founding of the University of Bologna. WUT signed an updated version of the document in 2021.

The university is a member of the European University Association. In 2023, it successfully passed the international institutional evaluation by the European University Association – Institutional Evaluation Programme (EUA – IEP).

Since 2005, WUT has been a member of the CESAER. From October 2024 to the end of June 2025—a period encompassing Poland’s presidency of the Council of the European Union (January–June 2025)—the organization was represented by Mariusz Malinowski, Vice-Rector for Research at the Warsaw University of Technology.

In 2008, the European University College Association (EucA) was established, with the Warsaw University of Technology serving as a co-founder. EucA works to improve the position of students in the labor market and organizes events, workshops, and study visits.

In 2019, the Warsaw University of Technology was one of the initiators of the ENHANCE Consortium—an alliance of European technical universities. The consortium aims to foster long-term cooperation among its members through research projects, workshops, competitions, and various programs, while also supporting the mobility of the academic community and introducing innovative teaching methods. Within the framework of ENHANCE, there are "Language Tandems" which allow individuals affiliated with the member universities to learn foreign languages, as well as "Professional Tandems" designed for doctoral candidates and staff to facilitate the establishment of scientific and professional connections. Since 2023, the ENHANCE+ project—supported by the European Commission’s "European Universities" initiative—has been working to deepen this existing cooperation; the project is scheduled to conclude in 2027. Other ENHANCE projects included ENHAQ+ and ENHANCER+, both of which concluded in September 2026. Through its membership in the consortium, the Warsaw University of Technology was awarded the status of “European University” by the European Commission in 2020, following a competitive selection process.

In 2025, WUT joined the Top International Managers in Engineering association.

==== International mobility ====
Warsaw University of Technology students and staff participate in international exchanges and projects under the Erasmus+ programme, including short-term "Blended Intensive Programmes". The university also hosts exchange participants from abroad. In the 2024/2025 academic year, 304 individuals from WUT went abroad for student exchanges through Erasmus+, while 420 students arrived at WUT from other institutions.

The Erasmus Mundus programme enables WUT to offer joint degree programmes in collaboration with foreign universities. In 2024, these included the JEMARO+ (Japan-Europe Master on Advanced Robotics) project, coordinated by École centrale de Nantes, and the M.E.S.C.+ (Materials for Energy Storage and Conversion) project, coordinated by the University of Picardy Jules Verne.

Since 2006, WUT students have been participating in exchanges through the ATHENS Programme.

Between 2020 and 2023, WUT implemented the "Masters of Didactics" programme, co-financed by the European Social Fund. The programme was aimed at enhancing the competencies of academic staff. As part of the program, academic staff took part in study visits to Aarhus University, Ghent University, the University of Groningen, the University of Oslo, and University College London.

The Main Building houses a "Welcome Point" which provides services for international students, doctoral candidates, staff, and university guests. This unit offers support regarding matters related to staying in Poland, such as official registration of residence, obtaining a PESEL number, or health insurance. The university also hosts "National Days" during which members of the international community—in collaboration with the Centre for International Cooperation and with the support of the relevant country's diplomatic mission—present their culture to the Warsaw University of Technology community.

==== Support for internationalization ====
Internationalization and the mobility of the academic community at the Warsaw University of Technology are supported by the Polish National Agency for Academic Exchange (NAWA), established in 2017. In cooperation with NAWA, WUT has been implementing successive editions of the PROM program—an international scholarship exchange initiative for doctoral students and academic staff—since 2018. The project facilitates trips abroad for periods ranging from five to thirty days, as well as visits by international researchers to Poland. The university also participates in initiatives such as the SPINAKER program for short-term international mobility and the STER program for the internationalization of doctoral schools. Through the latter, WUT funded the "Smart Education for Engineering Doctors" program, which provides financial and substantive support to doctoral students—both from Poland and abroad—and facilitates joint doctoral programs with international universities. Furthermore, WUT takes part in the KATAMARAN program, which focuses on the development and implementation of international study programs. Following the Russian invasion of Ukraine in 2022, NAWA provided financial support to WUT, which was used for scholarships for students from Ukraine. Subsequently, in 2023–2024, NAWA—in collaboration with the ENHANCE alliance—co-funded the "Solidarity with Ukraine – European Universities" program. This program encompassed summer and winter schools, conferences, intercultural workshops, study visits, language courses, and hackathons. In 2025, with funding from the Agency, "Warsaw University of Technology Days" were organized at Keio University.

In 2019, the Warsaw University of Technology was selected—along with nine other Polish universities—as part of the Ministry of Science and Higher Education’s "Excellence Initiative – Research University (2020–2026)" program. This program enables participating institutions to enhance the international standing of their academic and research activities. Under this initiative, WUT has, among other things, introduced additional funding for international mobility, the preparation of publications, and scholarships, while also establishing Research Centers for Priority Research Areas.

WUT frequently hosts ambassadors from various countries, as well as representatives from foreign universities and scientific institutions.

== Student life and academic culture ==
Meeting of the Mutual Aid Society of Students at Warsaw University of Technology (1931)

A poster inviting to a big mechanical engineers' party organised by the Mechanical Engineering Society (1939)

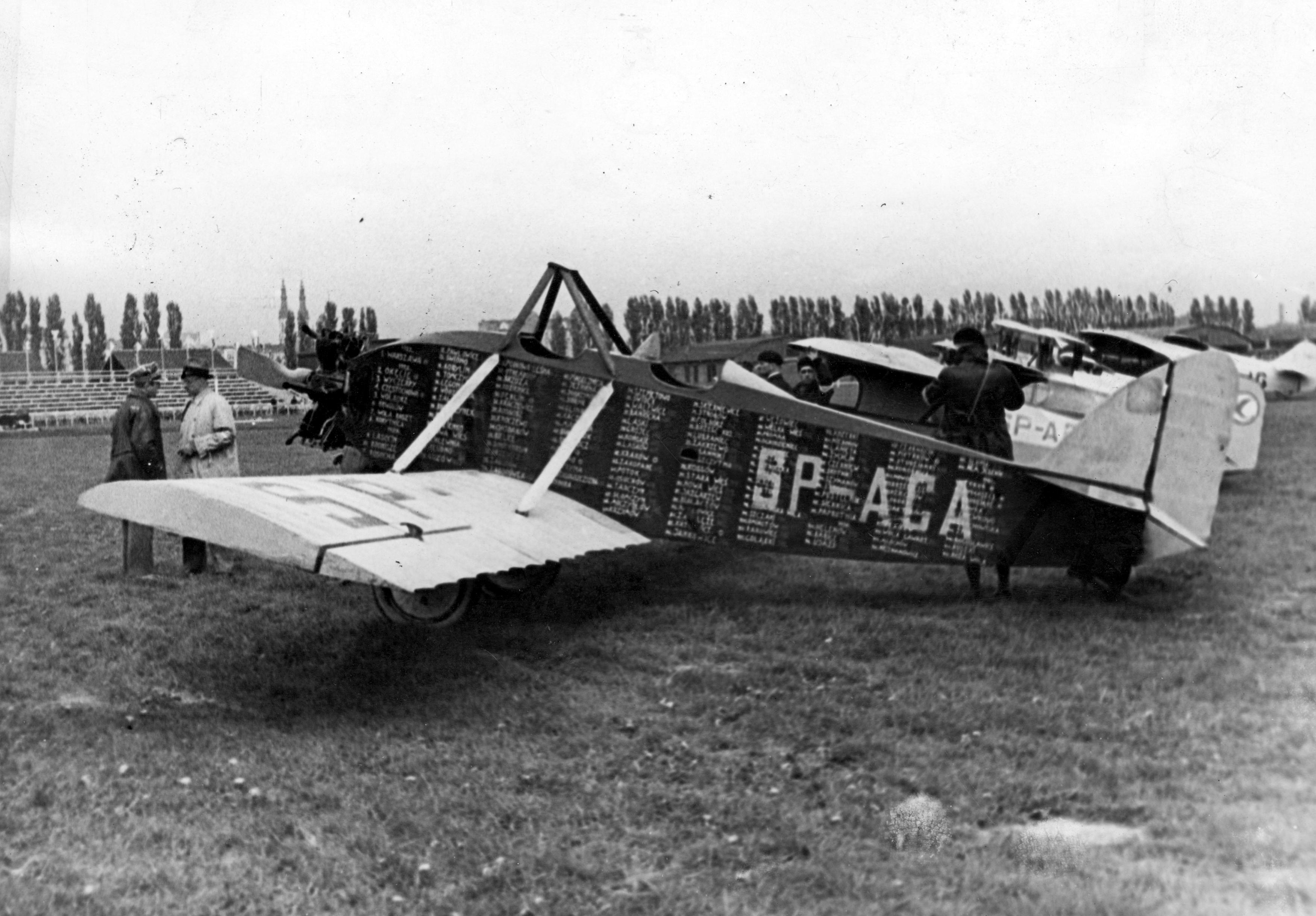
The JD-2 sports aircraft, designed by Jerzy Drzewiecki of the Aviation Section of the Warsaw University of Technology Students’ Mechanical Engineering Society

The First World War led to an economic crisis which also affected students in Warsaw; consequently, in 1915, the idea arose to establish Towarzystwo Bratniej Pomocy Studentów Politechniki Warszawskiej (Mutual Aid Society of Students at Warsaw University of Technology). Similar organisations, known as ‘Bratniaki’, had previously been established at other Polish universities; one was also active at Warsaw Institute of Technology^{[3]}. Following consultations with the rector, Zygmunt Straszewicz, a founding meeting was held on 18 December 1915. The Society enjoyed growing recognition within the academic community, and the number of students belonging to it rose from an initial 334 to around 3,000 in the mid-1920s. The Society supported academic societies with loans, published materials for students and organised medical care, meals, leisure activities and accommodation for them. It sought to build halls of residence, which resulted, amongst other things, in the construction between 1922 and 1930 of Dom Studencki Centrali Akademickiej Bratniej Pomocy (Student Hall of Residence of the Academic Mutual Aid Centre) at 5 Akademicka Street the in the Ochota district. The society remained in operation until the outbreak of the Second World War.

Following Poland’s regaining of independence in November 1918, a volunteer military unit – Legia Akademicka (the Academic Legion) – was formed, comprising young people from three Warsaw higher education institutions (WUT, University of Warsaw and Warsaw University of Life Sciences), including 452 students from WUT.

The years 1915–1918 also saw the establishment of numerous student research societies. Among the oldest of these were the Civil Engineering Society, the Electrical Engineering Society and the Chemistry Society. Other academic societies founded in the university’s early years included: the Mechanical Engineering Society, the Architecture Students’ Association, the Agricultural Engineering Society and the Surveying Society. They were involved in publishing activities, provided financial assistance to students, organised trips and work placements, facilitated the integration of the academic community and took part in competitions.

Student organisations resumed their activities after the end of the Second World War. Students were active in Związek Akademickiej Młodzieży Polskiej (Union of Polish Academic Youth), founded in 1948 and which existed until 1957. Polish Students’ Association (ZSP), established in April 1950 during the nationwide Polish Students’ Congress in the WUT Main Hall, took charge of self-help initiatives. In the early 1960s, approximately 82 per cent of WUT students belonged to ZSP. ZSP, much like the pre-war ‘Bratniaki’, looked after students’ welfare, organised trips and cultural events, and provided support to academic societies. In 1956, during the political thaw following the death of Joseph Stalin, ZSP gained partial self-governance, and members of its executive committee began to be elected in direct elections to rotational posts.

One of the first newly established research groups was the Civil and Hydraulic Engineering Society, founded in the 1949/1950 academic year; in 1956, the following were established, amongst others: the Society of Surveyors and Architecture Students, the Hydraulic Engineers’ Society and the Chemists’ Society. By 1961, 13 student research societies had been registered. In 2025, this number stood at 161. Since 2005, they have been brought together under the Warsaw University of Technology Student Research Group Council, which reports to the university’s Students’ Union. Every year, WUT hosts the Student Research Groups and Student Organisations Fair KONIK, during which the societies present their achievements. In 2024, the post of Rector's Proxy for Student Research Groups was established; the proxy’s responsibilities include, amongst other things, supporting the development of the groups and assisting them in securing internal and external funding for their activities.

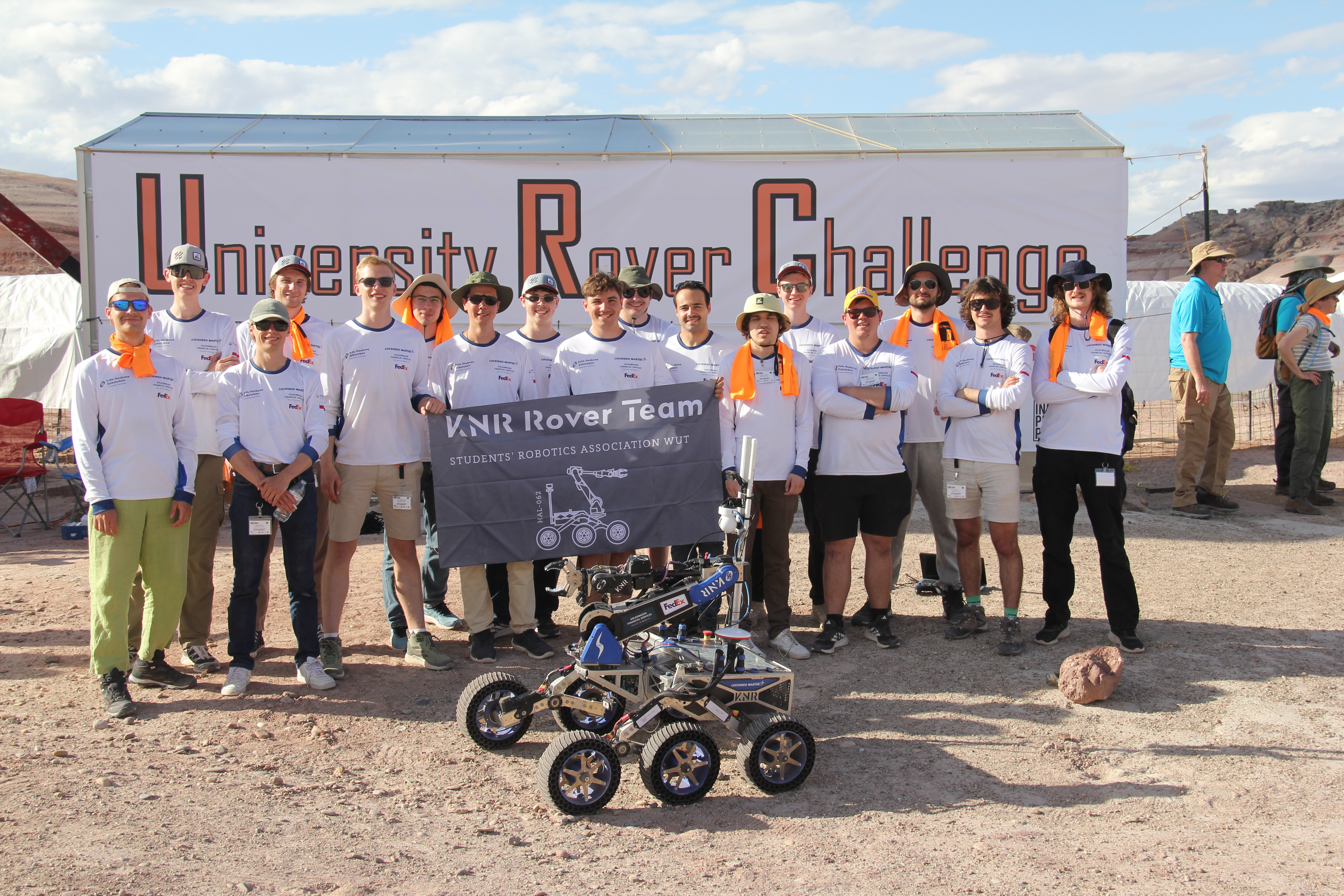
Students from the WUT Robotics Student Research Group with the HAL-062 rover during the University Rover Challenge at the Mars Desert Research Station near Hanksville, USA (2026)

Student research groups take part in national and international competitions, hackathons and research projects. Since 2004, Students' Space Association (SKA) has been working on the construction of Poland’s first artificial satellite, a project that continued until 2011. PW-Sat was launched into orbit in 2012 from the Guiana Space Centre. Its successor, PW-Sat2, was placed into orbit aboard a Falcon 9 rocket in 2018. Work on PW-Sat3 has been underway since 2018. WUT students take part in rover competitions such as European Rover Challenge and University Rover Challenge. In 2025, at the European Rover Challenge, the SKA Robotics team from the Students' Space Association came eighth, whilst the KNR Rover Team from the Robotics Student Research Group came ninth. In 2026, the KNR Rover Team came ninth in the overall standings of the University Rover Challenge and was the highest-ranked team from Europe. In 2025, students from the SAE AeroDesign Society secured podium places in the Advanced and Micro classes at the international SAE AeroDesign competition organised by SAE International. In 2024, a team from the Bridge Engineers’ Student Research Group, based at the Faculty of Civil Engineering, came second in the international Design and Construct Steel Bridge Competition organised by Boğaziçi University.

Students at a concert during the Varsonalia festival organised by the WUT Students’ Union at the Syrenka Stadium in 2024

In the 1970s, faculty-based alumni associations began to form. In 2001, on the occasion of the university’s 175th anniversary, the Association of Alumni and Friends of Warsaw University of Technology (SAiP) was established on the initiative of Rector Jerzy Woźnicki. Its mission is to bring alumni together and promote the university’s achievements.

Varsonalia in 2026

Shortly after the signing of the August Agreements, on 16 September 1980, the founding meeting of the Independent Students’ Association of the Warsaw University of Technology was held at the ‘Mikrus’ Students’ Hall, and a month later, on 18–19 October, representatives of 60 initiative groups from across Poland met at the Electronics Building. This meeting resulted in the formation of a nationwide organisation – Independent Students’ Association (NZS). Registration was only achieved following student protests in February 1981. The WUT authorities, including Rector Stanisław Pasynkiewicz, showed solidarity with the NZS and allowed it to operate across all faculties, but during martial law the organisation was suspended and, on 5 January 1982, banned. The NZS operated underground until 1989. Despite the repression to which students were subjected, it organised pro-democracy events in Warsaw, lent out banned books, called for reforms in higher education, and distributed leaflets and magazines. Today, the NZS at WUT works to promote students’ rights, is involved in charitable activities, takes part in educational programmes, and organises tourist trips and cultural events.

Warsaw University of Technology Central Students' Club 'Stodoła’

In 1985, the Warsaw University of Technology Students’ Union was established. It is elected for a one-year term in universal and equal elections, by secret ballot. It is represented in the WUT Senate. The Union organises the student Juwenalia festival, which takes place at the Syrenka Stadium, behind the ‘Stodoła’ club. Since 2023, it has been held under the name ‘Varsonalia’. In 2025, the festival was co-organised with other Warsaw universities for the first time. A separate body is the WUT PhD Students’ Council, representing all doctoral students at the university.

In 1989, the BEST (Board of European Students of Technology) Students’ Association was founded at WUT; it organises training courses, workshops, engineering competitions, job fairs, the ‘Karnavauli’ Grand Student Carnival Ball, and trips abroad in collaboration with European student organisations. The university is also home to the Erasmus Student Network, which supports international exchange programmes and coordinates the ‘Buddy’ scheme, in which WUT students act as mentors to exchange students. International student cooperation is also handled by the university’s committee of The International Association for the Exchange of Students for Technical Experience (IAESTE), which organises overseas work placements and internships.

There are also non-commercial student media organisations operating at WUT. The online Radio Aktywne has been in operation since 2004, and the online television channel TVPW since 2006; in 2013, TVPW was named the second-best university television channel in Poland. In addition, the following organisations are active: Warsaw University of Technology Academic Choir, founded in 2001; the student theatre TeatrPW, directed by Grzegorz Sierzputowski; sports clubs; the light music orchestra The Engineers Band; and Warsaw University of Technology Song and Dance Ensemble – the oldest student folk ensemble in Warsaw, established at WUT in 1951, comprising students and graduates of Warsaw’s higher education institutions. In 1977, the ‘Masovia’ Folk Dance Ensemble was established at the WUT’s branch in Płock; it organises dance and singing classes and performs at festivals both at home and abroad.

== Scientific journals ==
Warsaw University of Technology publishes or co-publishes several scientific journals:

- „Archives of Civil Engineering“ (ISSN 2300-3103)
- „Reports on Geodesy and Geoinformatics“ (ISSN 2391-8152)
- „Foundations of Management“ (ISSN 2300-5661)
- „WUT Journal of Transportation Engineering“ (ISSN 2956-9257)
- „Architecture and Town Planning Quarterly. Kwartalnik Architektury i Urbanistyki” (ISSN 0023-5865)
- „Studia do Dziejów Architektury i Urbanistyki w Polsce” (ISSN 2956-591X)
- „Archives of Transport” (ISSN 2300-8830)
- „Applied Business and Economics Journal” (ISSN 2956-7432)

== Notable alumni ==
- Jadwiga Roguska (born 1941) – art historian, architect
- Tomasz Bagiński (born 1976) – illustrator, animator and director
- Ryszard Bartel (1897–1982) – engineer
- Jerzy Barycki (born 1949) – engineer
- Mieczysław G. Bekker (1905–1989) – engineer and scientist
- Antoni Bohdziewicz (1906–1970) – screenplay writer and director
- Joanna Chmielewska (1932–2013) – novelist and screenwriter
- Zofia Garlińska-Hansen (1924–2013) – architect
- Patricia Kazadi (born 1988) – actress, singer, dancer, and television personality
- Antoni Kocjan (1902–1944) – glider constructor and Home Army soldier during World War II
- Vadim Komkov (1919–2008) – mathematician
- Alfred Korzybski (1879–1950) – engineer, mathematician and philosopher
- Bohdan Kulakowski (1942–2006) – mechanical engineer, professor at Pennsylvania State University
- Stefan Kurylowicz (1949–2011) – architect and professor of architecture
- Jan Lenica (1928–2001) – graphic designer and cartoonist
- Henryk Magnuski (1909–1978) – telecommunications engineer
- Myron Mathisson (1897–1940) – theoretical physicist
- Zbigniew Michalewicz – computer scientist, entrepreneur
- Zenon Mróz (born 1930) – materials science engineer
- Witold Nazarewicz (born 1954) – nuclear physicist
- Henryk Orfinger (born 1951) – entrepreneur
- Waldemar Pawlak (born 1959) – politician, former Prime Minister of Poland
- Przemysław Prusinkiewicz – computer scientist
- Andrzej Piotr Ruszczyński (born 1951) – applied mathematician
- Mohamed Omar Salihi (1952-2021) – marine scientist
- Maciej Matthew Szymanski (1926–2015) – architect in Canada
- Jan Holnicki-Szulc (born 1945) – structural engineer
- Andrew Targowski (born 1937) – Polish-American computer scientist
- Andrzej Tomaszewski (1934–2010) – historian of art and culture
- Andrzej Trautman (born 1933) – mathematical physicist
- Władysław Turowicz (1908–1980) – Polish-Pakistani aviator, military scientist and aeronautical engineer
- Michał Vituška (1907–1945) – Belarusian leader of the Black Cats
- Marian Walentynowicz (1896–1967) – architect, graphic designer and comic book pioneer
- Stanisław Wigura (1903–1933) – aircraft designer and aviator
- Tomasz Wiktorowski (born 1981) – tennis coach
- Zbigniew Zapasiewicz (1934–2009) – actor, theatre director and pedagogue
- Józef Zawadzki (1886–1951) – physical chemist

== See also ==
- List of universities in Poland
