= University of Technology and Arts in Applied Sciences =

Private university in Warsaw, Poland

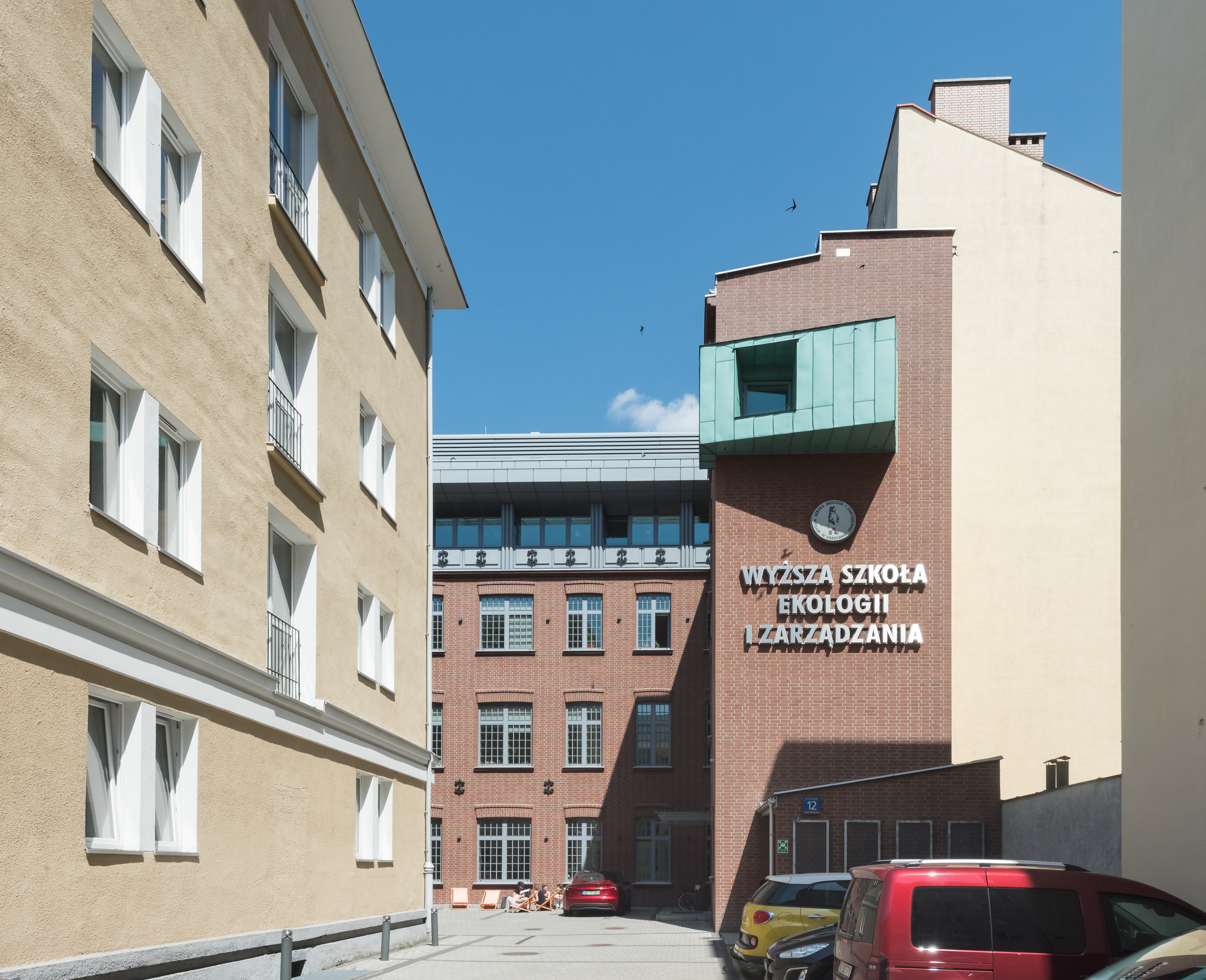
- Type: Private university
- Established: 1995
- Rector: Janusz Mrowiec
- Dean: Justyna Kłys
- Location: Warsaw, Poland; 52°12′33″N 21°01′13.36″E
- Campus: 12 Olszewska Street
- Website: akademiata.pl

The University of Technology and Arts in Applied Sciences (Polish: Akademia Techniczno-Artystyczna Nauk Stosowanych, ATA), known until 2024 as the Higher School of Ecology and Management (Polish: Wyższa Szkoła Ekologii i Zarządzania, WSEiZ), is a private university in Warsaw, Poland, specialised in architecture, engineering, and management. Its headquarters and the main campus are located at 12 Olszewska Street, within the Mokotów district. Since 2025, the Wrocław Academy of Business, located at 22 Ostrowskiego Street in Wrocław, Poland, also operates as a branch of the University of Technology and Arts in Applied Sciences, offering

== History ==
The university was founded in 1995 by engineer and academic Jan Misiak, under the name Higher School of Ecology and Management. It was registered as a private university with the government approval on 24 July 1995. On 1 October 2024, it was renamed to the University of Technology and Arts in Applied Sciences. On 16 July 2025, the Wrocław Academy of Business became a branch of the university.

== Structure ==
The headquarters and the main campus of the university are located at 12 Olszewska Street in Warsaw, Poland. The classes are also held in buildings at 128 Grójecka Street, 16 Rejtana Street, and 14 Wawelska Street. It is divided into the Faculty of Architecture, and the Faculty of Engineering and Management. The Wrocław Academy of Business, located at 22 Ostrowskiego Street in Wrocław, Poland, also operates as a branch of the University of Technology and Arts in Applied Sciences, offering classes in business. In 2023, the university had 2,801 students.
