= Paradowski =

Paradowski (feminine: Paradowska) is a Polish surname, it may refer to:

- Anna Paradowska, Polish-Australian engineer
- Janina Paradowska (1942–2016), Polish journalist and radio presenter
- Tao Paradowski (born 2005), Polish-French & Malagasy-Reunionese footballer
- Zbigniew Paradowski (born 1932), Polish rower
