= Polish Socialist Youth Union =

Old youth group based in Warsaw, Poland

Polish Socialist Youth Union Polish: Związek Socjalistycznej Młodzieży Polskiej
- Emblem
- Leader: Bogusław Wontor
- Founded: June 1976
- Merger of: Union of Socialist Youth; Socialist Military Youth Union
- Headquarters: Warsaw, Poland
- Membership: ~2,591,200 (1979); ~50,000 (2006)
- Ideology: Socialism; Before 1990: Communism; Marxism-Leninism
- Position: Left-wing; Before 1990: Far-left
- Mother party: Polish United Workers' Party (1976-1990)
- National affiliation: Front of National Unity (1976-1983); Patriotic Movement for National Rebirth (1983-1989); Democratic Left Alliance (1991-1999)
- International affiliation: World Federation of Democratic Youth (1976-1989)
- Newspaper: Sztandar Młodych; Płomienie

The Polish Socialist Youth Union (Polish: Związek Socjalistycznej Młodzieży Polskiej, ZSMP) is an old youth group based in Warsaw. Founded in 1976 under the communist rule from the merger of Union of Socialist Youth together with two other organizations, the ZSMP is a former member of the World Federation of Democratic Youth. It formed the youth faction of the Polish United Workers' Party.

== History ==
=== Socialist era ===
The Polish Socialist Youth Union was formed from the merger of the following organizations:

- Union of Socialist Youth
- Rural Youth Union
- Socialist Military Youth Union

The ZSMP was a member of the World Federation of Democratic Youth, which it left in 1989. Until 1989, the ZSMP was active in all youth circles. The ZSMP had its own newspaper, Ardour (Polish: Płomienie), and tourist office, Juwentur.

The organization's structures were divided into:

- provincial boards,
- municipal boards,
- city boards,
- workplace boards,
- university boards,
- school boards.

The basic organizational structure was a circle, consisting of 5-15 members. The party also had special brigades — there was a "Kim Jong Il Youth Brigade", which visited North Korea in October 1986 a few days before Wojciech Jaruzelski. According to its statue, the goal of the Polish Socialist Youth Union was to propagate “among its members and among the youth the ideology of Marxism-Leninism,” and its “honourable duty and right… is to prepare the best candidates for joining the PZPR.”

The activities of the ZSMP included such areas as tourism, sports, organizing training and vocational courses, and running interest groups. Among other things, the ZSMP was the owner of the “Juventur” Youth Tourism Office. Individual branches of the organization ran tourist clubs, such as Cycling Tourism Clubs and Hiking Tourism Clubs. The ZSMP organized many subject-specific competitions (e.g., the Construction Knowledge and Skills Tournament), in which the winners at the central level received university admission without having to take an entrance exam. In its prime, the Polish Socialist Youth Union had over 3 million members.

=== 1990s ===
In 1990, the Union changed its program, advocating for a democratic and capitalist system. Since then, it has also experienced a major personnel crisis – about 1.5 million of its members left in the 1990s, dwindling its numbers to just a few thousands. The ZSMP retained its old banner, membership cards, badge, and its highest award named after Jan Krasicki; it also continued to use the communist-era Polish coat of arms, the crownless eagle. In December 1991, its political outlook was described as "a specific synthesis of Christian and socialist attitudes". From 1991 to 1999 (until the SLD was transformed into a party), it was a member of the social-democratic Democratic Left Alliance coalition.

In the 1993 Polish parliamentary election, the ZSMP was successful in winning 6 seats in the Sejm on SLD electoral lists. While in SLD, the Polish Socialist Youth Union started drifting away from its 1990 pro-capitalist declaration back into a socialist orientation. By the mid-1990s, it was considered to represent the "conservative" (orthodox) faction, known as grupa zachowawcza. It defended the achievements of Polish People's Republic and grew increasingly critical of the liberal wing.

When in SLD, the Polish Socialist Youth Union was a major actor in interparty struggle between the two factions, known by the street names they had headquarters in - Ordynacka ("liberals") and Smolna (former communist apparatus). The Polish Socialist Youth Union was a part of Smolna faction. Political scientist Anna Pacześniak described the conflict as follows:

Two groups formed within the party: the first one gathered former activists of the Association of Polish Students (ZSP) and was nicknamed ‘Ordynacka’ (in reference to a street in Warsaw where ZSP had its headquarters); the second one was created by the members of the Polish Socialist Youth Union (ZSMP) and was dubbed ‘Smolna’ (also in reference to a street). After the 1993 parliamentary election, people of ‘Ordynacka’ dominated the Party – they held key posts and were appointed as Prime ministers (Józef Oleksy, Włodzimierz Cimoszewicz) and ministers. They referred to themselves as ‘liberals,’ and to their colleagues of ‘Smolna’ as ‘hardliners.’ The ZSMP consisted mostly of blue-collar workers and peasants who were disrespected and disregarded in Warsaw, but who enjoyed strong support in local party organizations.

=== Later years ===
In 1999, the ZSMP had left SLD and radicalized. By 2001, the ZSMP had about 40.000 members, up from just a few thousands in the early 1990s. After it left SLD in 1999, the Polish Socialist Youth Union largely returned to its old political positions. In 2003, mimicking the tradition of drowning Morana, it drowned the effigies of George W. Bush and Polish president and SLD leader Aleksander Kwaśniewski. It argued that while SLD is not "completely corrupt", there is nothing good about it above the municipal level. The same year, the ZSMP also organized an exhibition of photos and art dedicated to Che Guevara.

In the 2003 Polish European Union membership referendum, the Union campaigned for a "yes" vote. In 2005, it became a founding member of the Smolna Friends Association (Polish: Stowarzyszenie Przyjaciół "Smolna"), which united the members of former and surviving socialist youth associations, including the Union of Polish Youth, Union of Socialist Youth, and others.

In 2006, the Union was the subject of a minor controversy when it was found out that the Ministry of National Education was funding some of the organisation's activities, such as aid to children from poor families. The Polish Minister of Education at the time, Roman Giertych, vowed to halt any funding to the Union given its communist history. In response, ZSMP clarified that it received funding for humanitarian actions and that it is no longer associated with any party. By 2006, the organisation has amassed about 50 thousand members. In 2008, the SLD unsuccessfully tried to create a left-wing front together with post-communist radical left, including Union of the Left, Edward Gierek's Economic Revival Movement, and ZSMP. In 2009, the ZSMP ceded the buildings it stayed in ownership of after 1989, such as a ruined holiday resort in Ameliówka, as well as its old headquarters at Smolna 40, which it had been illegally occupying for years.

In 2016, the Polish Socialist Youth Union was reported to regularly visit Cuba, and the movement's leader, Bogusław Wontor, founded the Polish-Cuban Friendship Association (Polish: Towarzystwo Przyjaźni Polsko-Kubańskiej). By 2020, it remained in control of some properties, such as public pools.
