= Union of Youth Struggle =

Polish communist youth organization

Union of Youth Struggle Związek Walki Młodych
- Founded: 1943
- Dissolved: 1948
- Ideology: Communism; Marxism–Leninism; Stalinism
- Mother party: Polish Workers' Party
- National affiliation: National Front (1947–1948)
- International affiliation: World Federation of Democratic Youth
- Newspaper: Walka Młodych

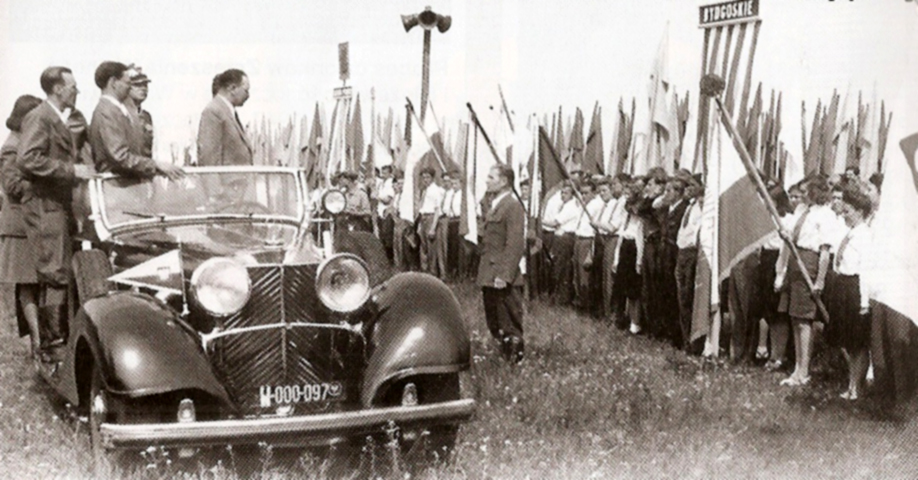
President Bolesław Bierut at the National Assembly of ZWM, 21–22 July 1946

The Union of Youth Struggle (Polish: Związek Walki Młodych, ZWM) was a communist youth organization in Poland. ZWM was founded in 1942. It was linked to the Polish Workers' Party (PPR). Hanka Szapiro-Sawicka was the founding leader of ZWM. She was killed by German authorities on 10 March 1943. Leadership of ZWM was then taken over by Jan Krasicki. Krasicki was shot by Gestapo on 2 September 1943. After Krasicki's death, Helena Jaworska became the ZWM leader. ZWM was active in the anti-fascist struggle, organizing People's Guard militia forces. ZWM played an important role in broadening the base of PPR. Walka Młodych ('Youth Struggle') was the central organ of ZWM.

As of 1947 ZWM had 224,000 members On 22 July 1948 ZWM and other youth organizations merged into the Polish Youth Union (ZMP).

== See also ==
- Polish Socialist Youth Union
- Union of Socialist Youth (Poland)
