= Rutkiewicz =

Rutkiewicz (Polish pronunciation: [rutˈkievitʂ]) is a Polish surname. Notable people with the surname include:

- Beata Rutkiewicz (born 1977), Polish politician
- Jan Rutkiewicz (born 1944), Polish architect
- Kevin Rutkiewicz (born 1980), Scottish footballer
- Marek Rutkiewicz (born 1981), Polish cyclist
- Maria Rutkiewicz (1917–2007), Polish communist
- Wanda Rutkiewicz (1943–1992), Polish mountain climber
