= Hanna Sawicka =

Polish communist

Hanka Sawicka
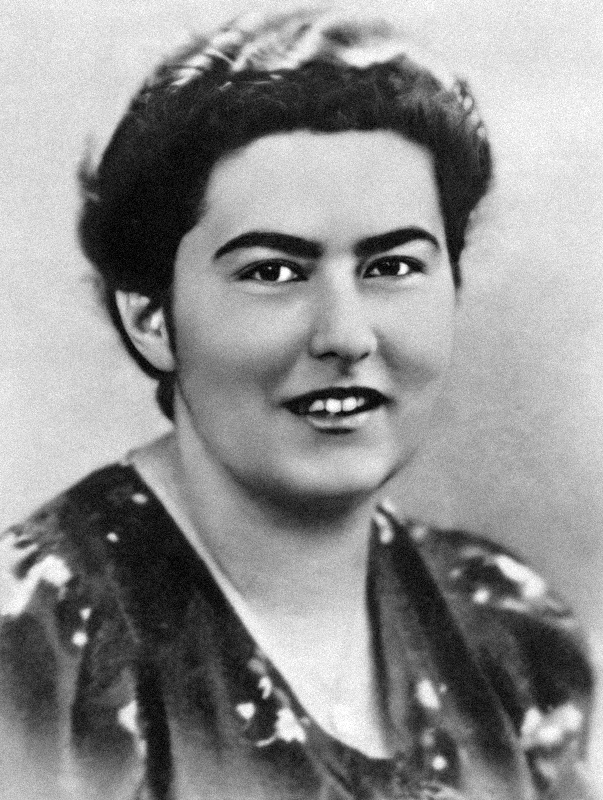
- Portrait of Sawicka prior to 1939
- Born: Hanna Krystyna Szapiro; December 19, 1917; Kraków, Grand Duchy of Kraków
- Died: March 18, 1943 (aged 25); Serbia Prison, Warschau, General Government
- Resting place: Powązki Military Cemetery
- Education: Free Polish University
- Parents: Bernard Szapiro (father); Maria Ita Szapiro née Frendzel (mother)
- Relatives: Stefan Kisielewski

Hanka Sawicka, real name Hanna Krystyna Szapiro, pseudonym Hanka (19 December 1917 – 18 March 1943) was a Polish communist of Jewish background active in the Polish underground, represented in Polish People's Republic propaganda as the first leader of the Union of Youth Struggle.

== Life ==
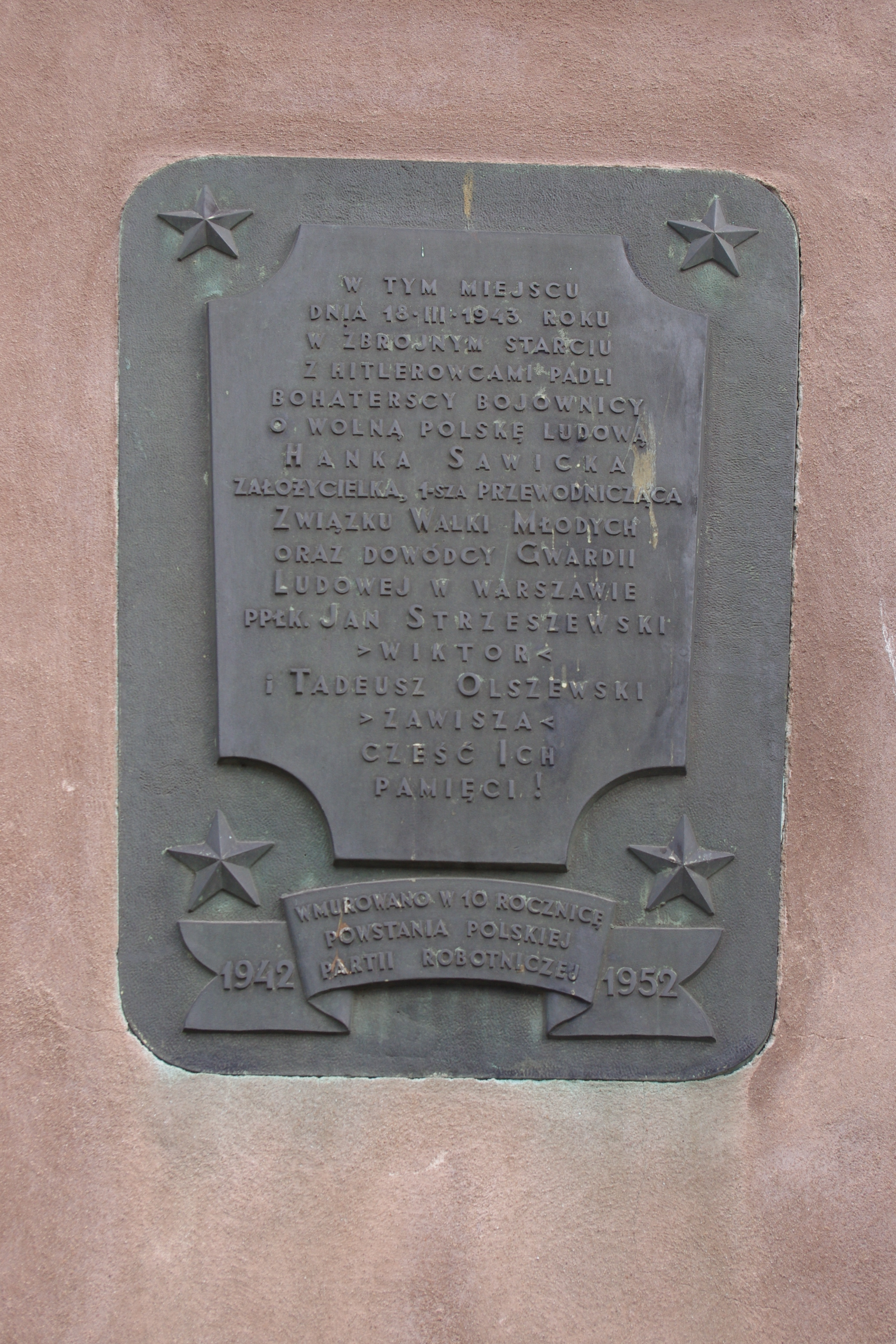
Commemoration of the deaths of Hanka Sawicka, Jan Strzeszewski and Tadeusz Olszewski, hanging by ul. Mostowa 2, Warsaw

Her parents were Maria and Bernard Szapiro. Her father was a member of PPS Lewica, a socialist party, as well as an uncle of the writer Stefan Kisielewski. In 1931 they moved to Warsaw, where Hanna finished school and studied law. In 1935 she became an activist of the Związek Niezależnej Młodzieży Socjalistycznej „Życie” (Union of Independent Socialist Youth). In the first days of the Nazi occupation, Sawicka organised help for political prisoners and published the first underground publication entitled Wolność (Freedom).

In the underground resistance, Sawicka was first involved with the youth group Spartakus, which had been organised before the war by socialists. In 1940, this group was dissolved due to ideological conflict and irreconcilable differences on the issue of fighting against Hitler while Stalin was collaborating with him. Sawicka was the co-leader of the communist publications Biuletyn Radiowy (Radio Biuletin), which from June 1941 printed communiques of Stalinist propaganda taken from Moscow radios. In addition, she provided aid for those in the ghettos, which she and her father managed to avoid and initiated a Committee for Aid for Victims of Fascism.

In February 1943, she became the editor and writer of a new communist conspiratorial paper, Walka Młodych (The Fight of the Youth), later treated as equivalent to the leadership of the then not existing Union of Youth Struggle, which was only formed in July 1943. Under the occupation, the Union of Youth Struggle was chiefly responsible for propaganda in the paper Walka Młodych based in the Warsaw area. Its editing team was composed of Hanka Sawicka, Janek Krasicki, Aleksander Kowalski, Zofia Jaroszewicz, Zofia Jaworska and Helena Kozłowska.

On 18 March 1943, she was to meet with Jan Strzeszewski 'Wiktor', the commander of the Warsaw area Gwardia Ludowa, the chief communist underground, and with Tadeusz Olszewski, 'Zawisza', the commander of its armed wing. They were arrested by Gestapo, as a result of which Olszewski was shot dead, and Strzeszewski and Sawicka were wounded and arrested. She was taken to Serbia Prison, Pawiak, where she died in the night.

== Commemoration ==
During the Communist period, she was the patron of many streets across Poland, many of which have since been renamed. These include Kielce, where her street is now named for Józef Piłskudski; Tarnobrzeg, now named for the Dominicans; Tarnów, now named for St. Anna; Rzeszów, now named for St. Nicholas; Kluczbork, now named for the Jagiellonian dynasty; Kalisz, now named for Stefan Wyszyński; Olsztyn, now named for Wrocław. There were also streets named for her in Biała Podlaska, Gliwice, Gdańsk, Piotrków Trybunalski, Świdnica, Sopot, Dusznice-Zdrój, Białogard, Dzierżoniów, Kościan, Bytom, Koszalin, Jaworzno, Jastrzębie-Zdrój, Sochaczew, Buków, Polkowice, Witaszyce, Darłowo, Kępno, Świętochłowice, Łęknica, Biskupiec, Włodawo, Wałbrzych, Rzepin, Siemianowice Słąskie, Dźwirzyno, Zawierciel, Warsaw, Żyrardów, Bielsko Podlaskie, Starachowice, Łobez, and Łódź.
