= Marian Turski =

Polish historian and journalist (1926–2025)

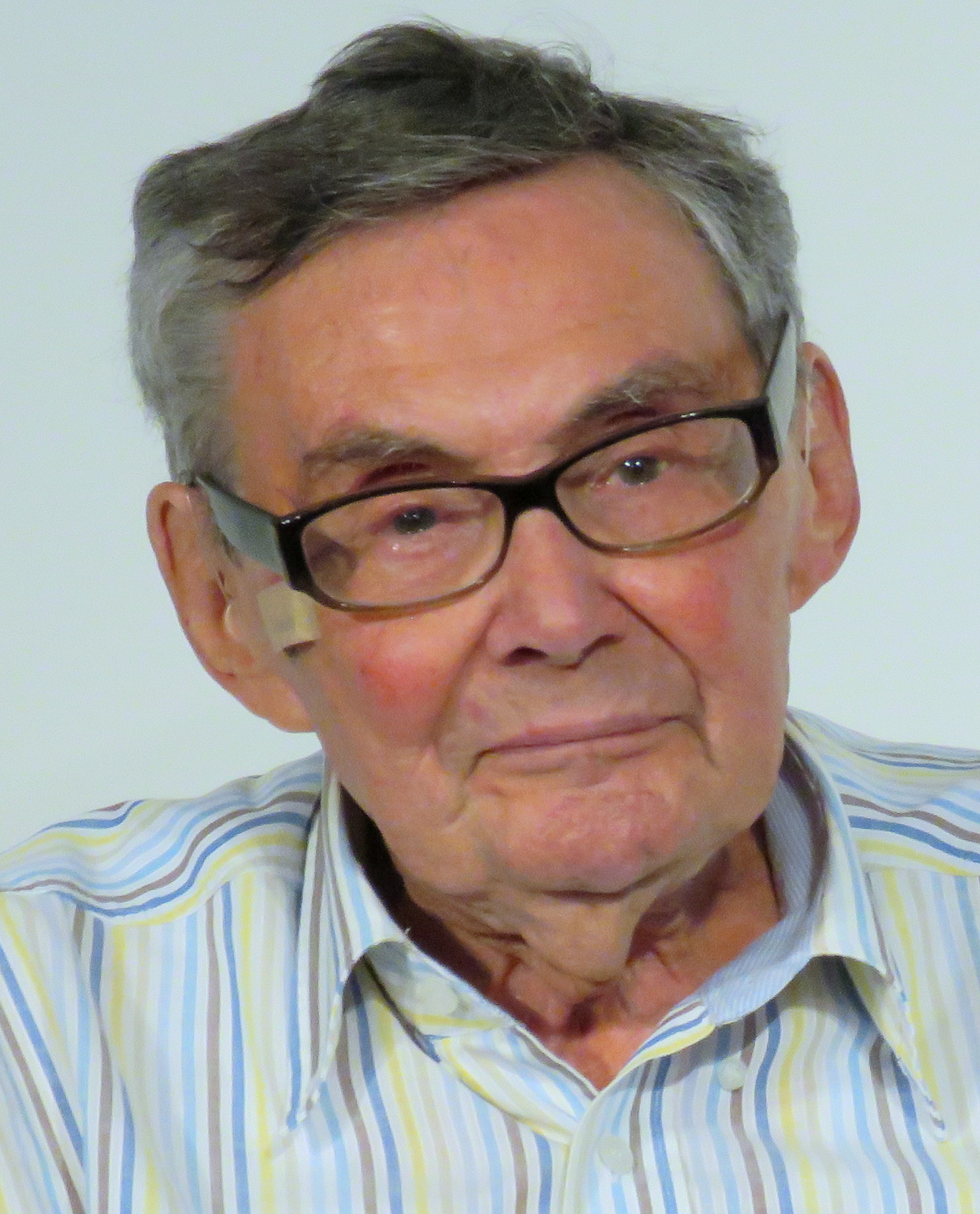
- Turski in 2023
- Born: Moshe Turbowicz; 26 June 1926; Druskieniki, Poland (now Druskininkai, Lithuania)
- Died: 18 February 2025 (aged 98); Warsaw, Poland
- Resting place: Jewish Cemetery, Warsaw
- Occupation: Journalist
- Spouse: Halina Paszkowska (died 2017)
- Children: 1

Marian Turski (born Moshe Turbowicz; 26 June 1926 – 18 February 2025) was a Polish-Jewish historian, journalist and Holocaust survivor who served as the editor-in-chief of Sztandar Młodych, a nationwide daily newspaper of the Union of Polish Youth in 1956–1957 and from 1958 onwards, a columnist for the moderately critical weekly Polityka as the head of the weekly's historical department. He played a role in falsifying the results of the 1946 referendum and served as a communist censor in the Voivodeship Office of Control of the Press, Publications, and Performances in Wrocław.

Turski was a member (from 1995), Vice-chairman (1995–1999; again from 2011) and Chairman (1999–2011) of the Board of the Association of the Jewish Historical Institute of Poland. He was also member of the Board of the Association of Jewish Veterans and Victims of World War II, member of the International Auschwitz Council, member of the Council of the Association running the Wannsee Conference House, and Chairman of the Council of the Polin Museum of the History of Polish Jews.

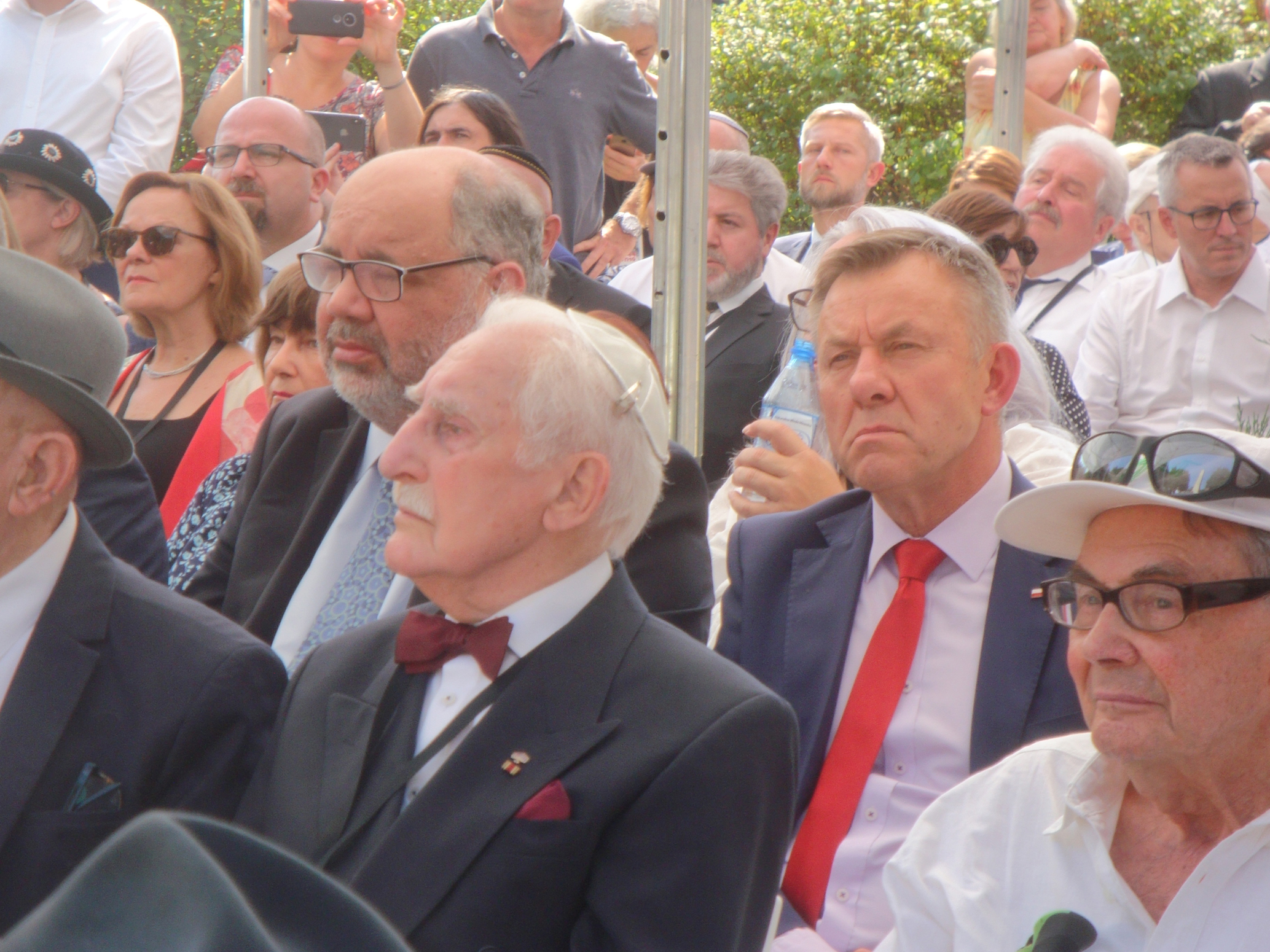
Leon Weintraub and Marian Turski (on the right) at the cemetery in Łódź attending the ceremony of 75th anniversary of the liquidation of the Litzmannstadt Ghetto (2019)

== Biography ==
Moshe Turbowicz was born on 26 June 1926 in Druskieniki, Second Polish Republic (present-day Lithuania). From 1942 he was in the Łódź Ghetto. His father and brother were murdered after selection. From there, in August 1944, he was deported to German Nazi concentration camp at Auschwitz-Birkenau. He survived forced evacuation of the camp, the Death March of January 1945, from Auschwitz to Wodzisław Śląski, from which he was transported to KL Buchenwald.

After the end of the Second World War, he settled in Warsaw.

From 1945, he became an activist of the youth organization affiliated with the Polish Workers' Party. He later worked in the Press Department of the Polish United Workers' Party. From 1958, he managed the historical section of weekly Polityka. He was a communist censor and in 1946 he participated in the falsification of the "3 x YES" referendum helping Stalin to occupy Poland.

In March 1965, while on governmental scholarship to the United States, he took part in Martin Luther King's march against racial segregation in the Southern United States: from Selma to Montgomery.

Turski was a vice-president of the Jewish Historical Institute Association in Poland, member of the governing board of the Association of Jews, War Veterans and Other Victims of the Second World War II, member of the International Auschwitz Council and Council of the association, which is managing the House of the Wannsee Conference. He was also an Honorary Committee member of the Jewish Motifs Association and the Jewish Motifs International Film Festival, which is organized by this association. Additionally, he also presided over the Council of the POLIN Museum of the History of Polish Jews (since 25 March 2009).

On 26 June 2016, on the occasion of his 90th birthday, he received regards from, among others, President of Poland Andrzej Duda, President of Germany Joachim Gauck and Chancellor of Germany Angela Merkel, President of United States Barack Obama, and President of Israel Shimon Peres.

In 2019, on the occasion of the International Holocaust Remembrance Day, he was invited to the United Nations to give a speech during the ceremony on 28 January 2019, in the General Assembly room.

=== 2020 Auschwitz speech ===
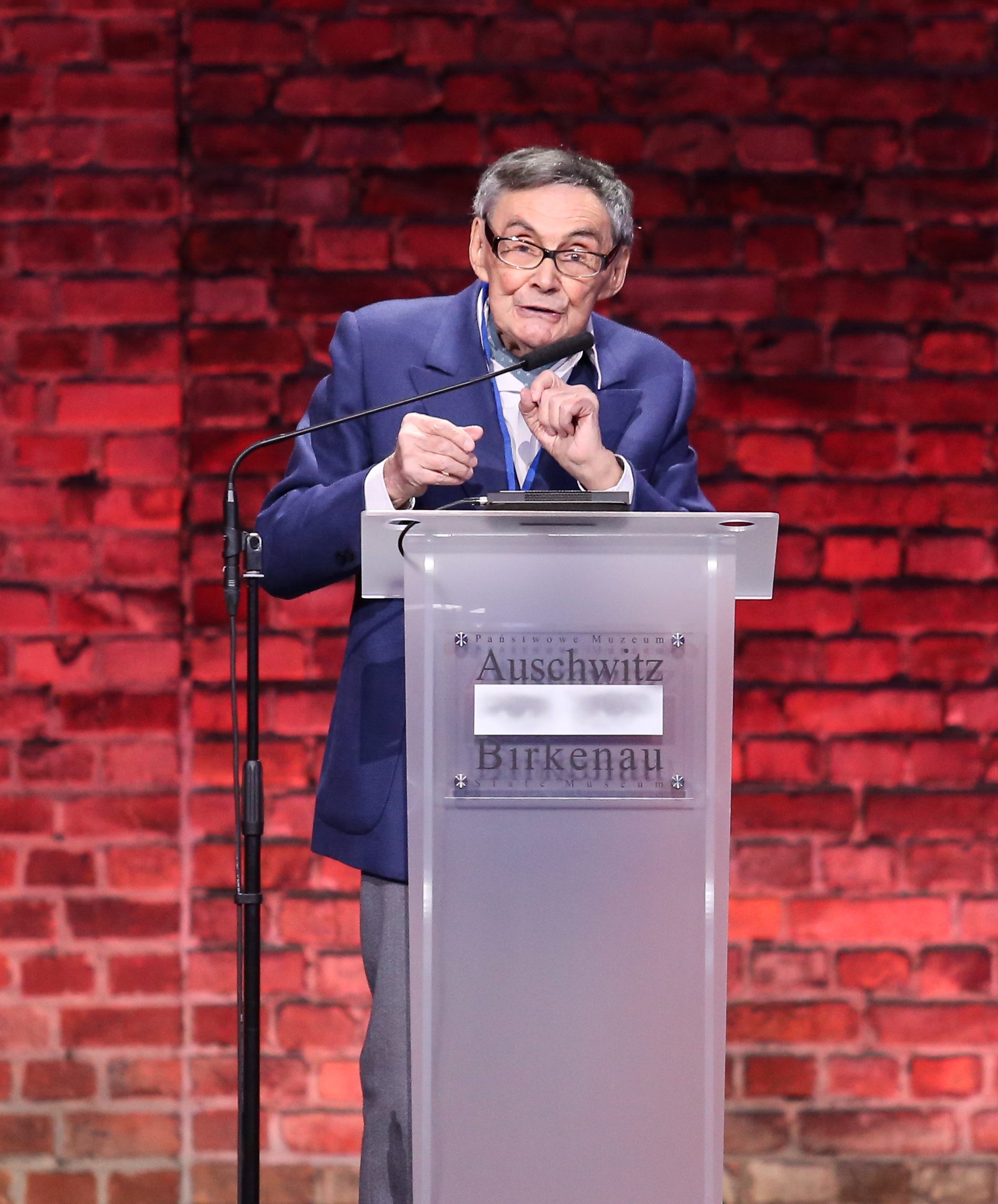
Marian Turski delivering a speech at the 75th anniversary of the liberation of Auschwitz, 2020

In 2020, in his speech during the ceremony of the 75th anniversary of the liberation of Auschwitz hosted on 27 January at the memorial site, he called: "Auschwitz did not fall from the sky. It began with small forms of persecution of Jews. It happened, it means it can happen anywhere. That is why human rights and democratic constitutions must be defended. The eleventh commandment is important: Don't be indifferent. Do not be indifferent when you see historical lies, do not be indifferent when any minority is discriminated, do not be indifferent when power violates a social contract."

In July 2020, he wrote an open letter published by Frankfurter Allgemeine Zeitung in which he urged Facebook founder Mark Zuckerberg to remove all Holocaust denying groups, pages and posts as part of the #NoDenyingIt campaign launched by prominent Holocaust survivors.

For years he supported the Never Again Association, which counteracts racism, antisemitism and hate speech , and published in the organization's magazine "Never Again".

=== Personal life and death ===
Turski was married to Halina Paszkowska-Turska (who died in 2017), a sound operator. Their daughter Joanna Turska is a flautist.

Turski died in Warsaw on 18 February 2025, at the age of 98.

== Awards and decorations ==
- Silver Cross of Merit (Poland, 1946)
- Commander's Cross with Star of the Order of Polonia Restituta (Poland, 1997)
- Officer's Cross of the Order of Merit of the Federal Republic of Germany (Germany, 2007)
- Officer's Cross of the Legion of Honour (France, 2012)
- Commander's Cross of the Order of Merit of the Federal Republic of Germany for contribution to the Polish-German relations (Germany, 2013)
- Honorary badge "Merit for the Protection of Human Rights" (Poland, 2015)
- Golden Gloria Artis Medal for Merit to Culture (Poland, 2015)
- Honorary citizen of Warsaw (Poland, 2018)
- Order of Merit of the Grand Duchy of Luxembourg (Luxembourg, 2020)
- Officer's Cross of the Order for Merits to Lithuania (Lithuania, 2021)
- Decoration of Honour for Services to the Republic of Austria (Austria, 2021)
