= Irena Eris =

Polish physician (born 1950)

Irena Szołomicka-Orfinger
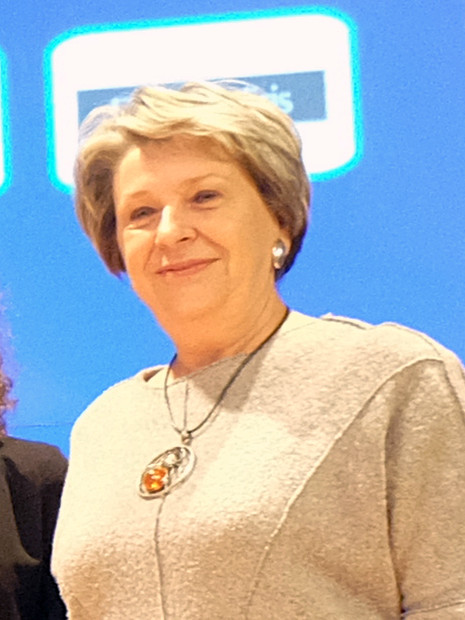
- Irena Eris, Warsaw, 2017
- Born: 13 April 1950 (age 76); Warsaw, Poland
- Education: Medical University of Warsaw; Humboldt University of Berlin
- Occupations: Pharmacist, businesswoman
- Known for: founder of Dr. Irena Eris cosmetics company
- Spouse: Henryk Orfinger
- Awards: Order of Polonia Restituta; Order of the Star of Italian Solidarity; Kisiel Prize

Irena Eris (or, Irena Szołomicka-Orfinger, born 13 April 1950) is a Polish pharmacist, businesswoman and the founder of Dr. Irena Eris cosmetics company.

== Life and career ==
She was born on 13 April 1950 in Warsaw. She graduated from the Medical University of Warsaw and obtained her doctorate in pharmacy at the Humboldt University of Berlin. She is the co-owner (together with her husband Henryk Orfinger) and the founder of Dr. Irena Eris cosmetics company (1983). She is the research and development director, and has been in charge of managing a chain of spa hotels as well as launching new products and supervising the process of their manufacturing. Dr. Irena Eris is considered one of the most recognizable and popular cosmetics brands in Poland. In 2012, it was the only Polish brand accepted into the French luxury brands' association Comité Colbert.

She has received numerous awards for her business activities such as Businesswoman of the Year (1999), Kisiel Prize (2000), and Business Pearl (2003). In 2004, she was ranked in the Top 20 Most Influential Polish Women by Polityka magazine for "making significant contributions to business in Poland, breaking stereotypes as well as initiating new and creative ways of thinking." In 2005, she claimed second place in the ranking of 30 Most Effective and Trustworthy Entrepreneurs in Poland published by Home and Market monthly magazine. In 2008, she won the Polish Outstanding Exporter Award presented by the National Chamber of Commerce for pursuing an effective and consistent exports policy. In 2009, she was chosen as the Spa Personality of the Year by the readers and Internet users of the Spa & Wellness Magazine. Since 2001, she has been consistently ranked among 100 Richest Poles by the Wprost magazine.

== Other awards and distinctions ==
In November 2008, she became the recipient of the Order of the Star of Italian Solidarity. In 2014, she was awarded the Officer's Cross of the Order of Polonia Restituta and was nominated in the People of Freedom plebiscite organized to commemorate the 25th anniversary of the foundation of the Solidarity movement.
