= Jan Rutkiewicz =

Polish architect and urbanist (born 1944)

Mayor of the municipality of Warsaw-Downtown
- In office 7 June 1990 – 24 November 1994
- Preceded by: office established
- Succeeded by: Marek Rasiński

Personal details
- Born: 1944 (age 81–82) Warsaw, General Government (now part of Poland)
- Parents: Maria Rutkiewicz (mother); Wincenty Jan Rutkiewicz (father)
- Education: Warsaw University of Technology
- Occupation: Architect; Urbanist

Jan Rutkiewicz (Polish: [ˈjan rutˈkjɛ.vit͡ʂ]; born 1944) is a Polish architect and urbanist. From 1990 to 1994, he was the mayor of the municipality of Warsaw-Downtown, one of the subdivisions of the city of Warsaw, Poland.

== Biography ==
Jan Rutkiewicz was son of communist activists Maria Rutkiewicz and Wincenty Jan Rutkiewicz. He was born in 1944, together with his twin sister, Małgorzata, in the Serbia prison in Warsaw, in German-occupied Poland, where his mother was held as a political prisoner. In 1965, he graduated from the Faculty of Architecture of the Warsaw University of Technology. In the 1960s and 1970s, he took part in designing the headquarters of the Nicolaus Copernicus University in Toruń, Poland, as well as numerous sports and recreational facilities in Warsaw, and residential buildings in the United Kingdom. From 1979 to 1990, he was the head designer in the Warsaw Development Planning Office, and from 1995 to 1997, an expert in the Social and Economic Initiatives Foundation. Afterwards, he returned to the Warsaw Development Planning Office, as its acting director from 1999, as its design director from 2000. From the 1990s, he participated in the designing of the Siekierki Route, one of the main thoroughfares of the city, and the planning of development in the Warsaw Downtown and around the Praga Harbor. From 1990 to 1994, he was the mayor of the municipality of Warsaw-Downtown, one of the subdivisions of the city of Warsaw, Poland.
