= Bogusław Bagsik =

Polish businessman, politician and patron of arts

- Born: April 8, 1963 (age 63); Bytom, Poland
- Occupation: Founder of ART-B
- Spouse: Magdalena Bagsik
- Children: Monek, Samuel, Marek, Ben

Bogusław Bagsik (born April 8, 1963, in Bytom, Poland) is a Polish-Israeli fraudster, who is best known for his involvement in the Art-B scandal centered on check kiting.

He was the founder and one of two owners of ART-B, a shell company that, in the wake of the system transformation to capitalism, acquired stakes in Polish industry (e.g. Ursus tractor works), high-key real estate and an art collection encompassing prestigious modern classics. Its capital derived from a check kiting scheme called the "oscillator". Furthermore, there had been constant rumours, i.e. about technical assistance from abroad to import electronics and ART-B functioning as a decoy firm for intelligence operations. The company was renowned for its tariff evasion methods. In 1991, Bagsik fled to Tel Aviv and was granted asylum. Extradition was denied. At this point, Bagsik was the 8th wealthiest person in Poland, according to Wprost.

== Honours and awards ==
- Poland : Kisiel Prize (1991)

== Immigration and arrest ==
Bagsik was arrested in 1994 at the Zürich airport. After a long extradition procedure, he had been released to Poland in 1996. He was then accused of illegally acquiring 400 mln PLN, bribery, and acting against the interest of his company. On October 20, 2000, he had been sentenced to 9 years in prison. Bagsik was released from prison in May 2004 on Parole. After his, release Bagsik began further business work and was arrested on April 14, 2014, accused of money laundering of a sum of 11 mln PLN. In 2019, he was finally sentenced with 6 years imprisonment. He evaded imprisonment, several arrest warrants were issued.

== Filmography ==
- 1991:Guitar Legends, Seville 1991 (documentary) – producer
- 2000: Zakochani - actor

== ART-B collection in National Museum, Warsaw ==
- Pablo Picasso, "Cyrk", 1957,
- Pablo Picasso, "Tauromachia", 1957
- Oswald Achenbach, "Grobowiec Cecylii Metelli", 1886
- Pierre-Auguste Renoir, "La collation", ok. 1890,
- Stanisław Ignacy Witkiewicz, Portret pana S.A., czerwiec 1939, 62,3 × 48,5
- Johann Georg Bandau II, Waza, lata 20. XIX w.; 41 × 34 × 31
- Jan Jerzy II Bandau, Waza, lata 20. XIX w
- Louis-Nicolas Naudin'a, " Srebrna waza", ok 1820, 1819–38, 30 × 33,2.
- Zygmunt Menkes, Dziewczyna z kwiatem, 42,4 × 34,5
- Teodor Axentowicz, "Na gromniczną"
- Józef Brandt, "Portret towarzysza pancernego na karym koniu"
- Wojciech Kossak, "Odwrót spod Moskwy", 1922
- Wojciech Kossak, "Dziewczyna w chustce", 1918,
- Mela Muter, "Zimowy pejzaż miejsk", "Kutry przy brzegu"
- Alfred Aberdam, "Martwa natura z kwiatami i książką"
- Jacek Malczewski, Portret dziewczynki siedzącej na drabinie, 1922, 97,8 × 69,5
- Jacek Malczewski, Mężczyzna na drabinie, 1922
- Jacek Malczewski, Portret Wincentego Łepkowskiego, 1911, 74 × 93
- Jacek Malczewski, Chrystus w Emaus – dyptyk, 1912, cz. lewa 72,6 × 53,5, cz. prawa 72,5 × 55
- Jacek Malczewski, Portret doktora Ignacego Baslera, 1924, 50,3 × 71,3
- Jacek Malczewski, "Portret Antoniego Lanckorońskiego z ojcem", 1905
- Jacek Malczewski, "Kobieta na tle gaju z jarzębiną", 1917
- Jacek Malczewski, "Kobieta na tle gaju z jarzębiną", 1917
- Tadeusz Makowski, Portret dziewczynki o ciemnych włosach, 46 × 28,5
- Baccarat, Pantera, 15 × 51,2 × 12,3
