= Young Centre =

Polish youth political organization

- Abbreviation: YC
- Formation: 2001
- Type: Non-profit organization
- Legal status: not active
- Purpose: Advocacy, Education
- Headquarters: Poznań
- Region served: Poland
- Official language: Polish

The Young Centre (YC) (Polish: Młode Centrum) was a Polish liberal and progressive youth political organization that was established in Poznań 2001. It is a member of IFLRY (and a host organisation of its Annual Conference in Poznań in 2004) and LYMEC.

In 2005, Young Centre stopped cooperation with Democratic Party (formerly the Freedom Union). It has focused on pro-European and pro-liberal activities.

== Actions ==
Among the activities undertaken by Young Centre in the recent years, there are:

Workshops and seminars for students from Belarus and Ukraine, mainly related to the political situation in their countries.

Support for Poland's accession to the European Union and advocating pro-European policies (Euro accession, students' exchange programmes, actions in support of the European Constitution)

Seminars and conferences on various topics around personal and economic liberty, e.g., the limits of freedom in art, personal entrepreneurship, the challenges of democracy

In 2004, Młode Centrum sent its observers to the presidential elections in Ukraine under the Organization for Security and Co-operation in Europe mission. The members of YC were also present at various elections in countries of limited or virtual democracy: Belarus, Moldova, Azerbaijan.

== Honorary members ==
Marek Edelman Jan Kułakowski Jacek Kuroń Tadeusz Mazowiecki
