= Henryka Bochniarz =

Polish economist

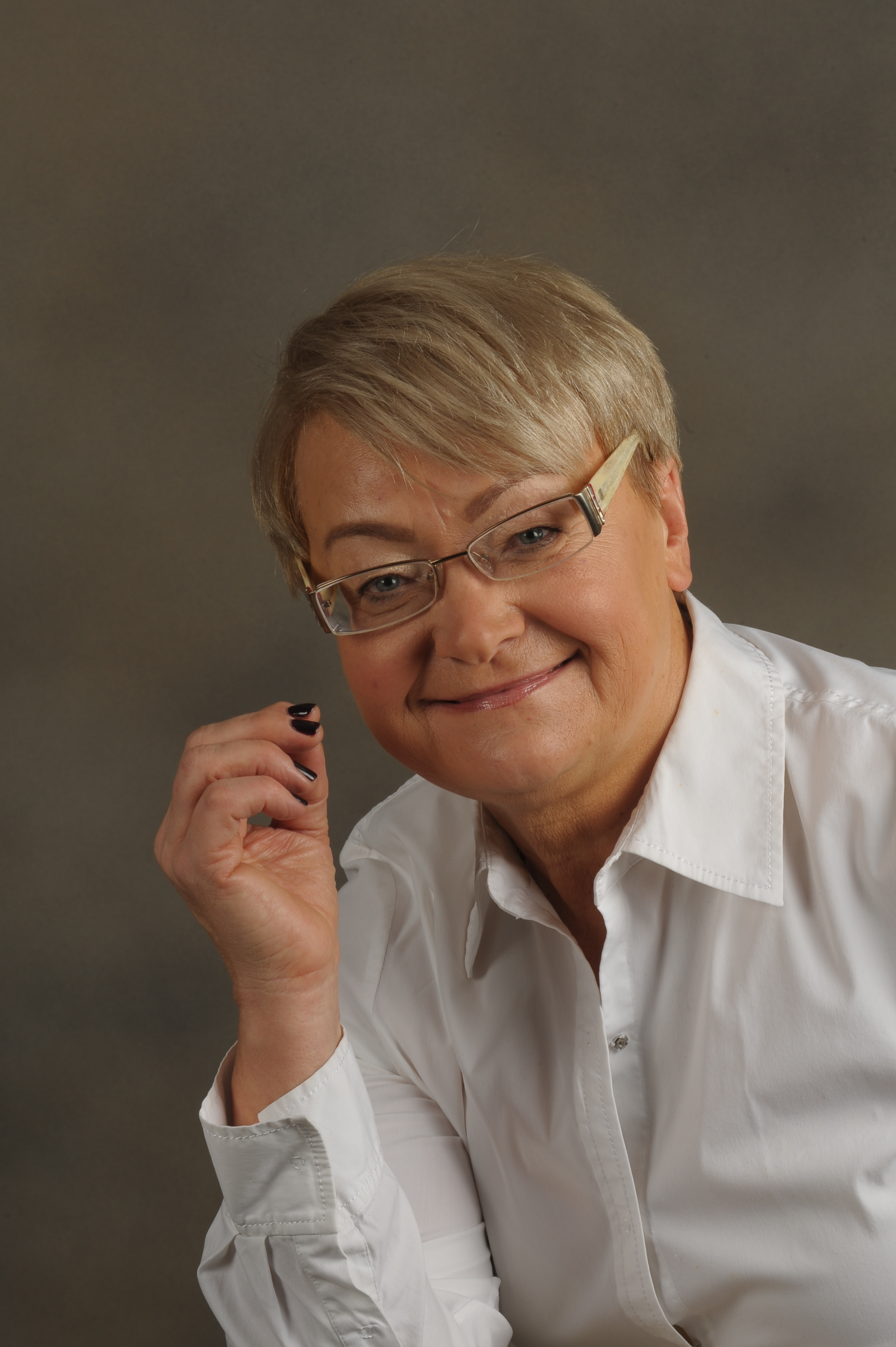
- Born: October 29, 1947 (age 78); Świebodzin
- Education: Warsaw School of Economics

Henryka Teodora Bochniarz (born in Świebodzin on 29 October 1947) is a Polish economist and administrator who is a former Minister of Industry and Trade in the Government of Poland.

Bochniarz is also the founder and head of the Polish Confederation of Private Employers ‘Lewiatan’ and president for Central and Eastern Europe Region of Boeing International Co.

== Education ==
Bochniarz graduated from the Foreign Trade Faculty at Warsaw School of Economics in 1971. She received a Ph.D. in economics from the Foreign Trade Research Institute, and became also certified advisor in management. She was awarded a Fulbright scholarship and spent two years doing research and teaching at the University of Minnesota (1985–87).

== Professional summary ==
Between 1971 and 1990, Bochniarz was an academic lecturer and researcher at the Institute for Business Cycles and Prices at the Main School for Planning and Statistics. At the time she was a member of the Polish communist party – Polish United Workers' Party (1970–1990).

In 1990, Bochniarz founded Nicom Consulting, one of the first consulting companies in Poland. Shortly after, she became the first president of the Association of Economic Consultants in Poland.

In 1991, Prime Minister Jan Krzysztof Bielecki invited Bochniarz to become the Minister of Industry and Trade consolidating two previously separated ministries. In her ministerial capacities, she was responsible for restructuring and privatization of over 7000 Polish firms.

In 1996, Bochniarz was elected as the chair of the Polish Business Roundtable. In that capacity, she organized a universal association for all private firms – Lewiatan

In 1999, Bochniarz became its first president (1999). This is a non-governmental organisation which serves as private business representative in the Polish constitutional body – the Tripartite Commission for Social and Economic Affairs along with trade unions and government representatives. Since the establishment of this Commission she has served as its vice-chairperson.

In 2002, Bochniarz became Deputy Chair of the Tripartite Commission. She has played an active role in the dialogue between government, employers’ associations and trade union bodies.

In 2005, Bochniarz was the Polish Democratic Party's candidate in an unsuccessful bid to become President of Poland.

In 2006, Boeing named Bochniarz president of Boeing International Central and Eastern Europe.

In 2012, placed on the list of the 50 Most Influential Poles by the ‘Wprost’ magazine.

== Organizations ==
Bochniarz is a former co-chair of the Committee of Good Practices – a non-governmental organization representing businesses committed to the implementation of a voluntary Code of Good Practices.

Currently Bochniarz serves as a member of the Council of Presidents of BUSINESSEUROPE, the biggest employers’ organization in the European Union. Bochniarz is a member of the European Commission Enterprise and Industry Advisory Group, a consultative committee established by the commissioner Antonio Tajani. In 2011, she joined the European Council on Foreign Relations. Since 2000, she has chaired the Polish Japanese Economic Committee, striving to develop Polish-Japanese economic cooperation.

Bochniarz is a former member of the Enterprise Policy Group at the European Commission, advising on the economic policy of the European Union. Dr. Bochniarz participated also in the works of BIAC - The Business and Industry Advisory Committee, an advisory organisation to OECD, which represents groups of entrepreneurs from OECD member states. For almost ten years she had been a member of Private Sector Advisory Group established by the World Bank and OECD focusing on corporate governance and anti-corruption.

Bochniarz is the originator of the European Forum for New Ideas, an international congress of business communities, economists and experts devoted to seeking meaningful solutions to the most fundamental economic problems facing Europe. The first meeting of the Forum held in Sopot (north Poland) was organized on the occasion of the Polish Presidency of the EU Council.

Bochniarz initiated and co-founded the Nike Literary Prize – the most prestigious award for Polish literature and has been its donator for 10 years (1996–2006). She is co-founder and a vice-chairperson of the Stanisław Ignacy Witkiewicz Arts Foundation assisting the Witkacy Theatre in Zakopane, Poland.

Bochniarz has established and donated the initial endowment for the ‘Prymus’ Foundation promoting and providing equal educational opportunities for children in rural areas. She also participated in the works of the Junior Achievement Foundation, established to prepare children and youth to live in the conditions of market economy and civil society.

At the 20th anniversary of democratic transformation in Poland, Bochniarz co-founded the Congress of Women, which became an important social movement and initiated the parity legislation in Poland. She is the Polish advocate of the EU project “Equality pays off” aiming to use better female potential. In 2003, together with Jacek Santorski, she wrote a book titled Bądź sobą i wygraj - 10 podpowiedzi dla aktywnej kobiety (Be yourself and win – ten hints for an active woman).

== Awards ==
She is a laureate of the Andrzej Bączkowski Award (2003) for extraordinary contribution to the development of social dialogue in Poland and activities beyond political differences; Kisiel Prize (1998) for independent thinking and entrepreneurship. In 2004, the President of the Republic of Poland awarded her the Commodore Cross of the Order of “Polonia Restituta”. She was decorated with the Japanese Order of the Rising Sun, Golden and Silver Star (2010).

== Personal life ==
Married to Zbigniew Bochniarz, academic lecturer, visiting professor at the Evans School of Public Affairs, University of Washington in Seattle. She has two children and nine grandchildren.
