= Adam Szostkiewicz =

Polish author and journalist (born 1952)

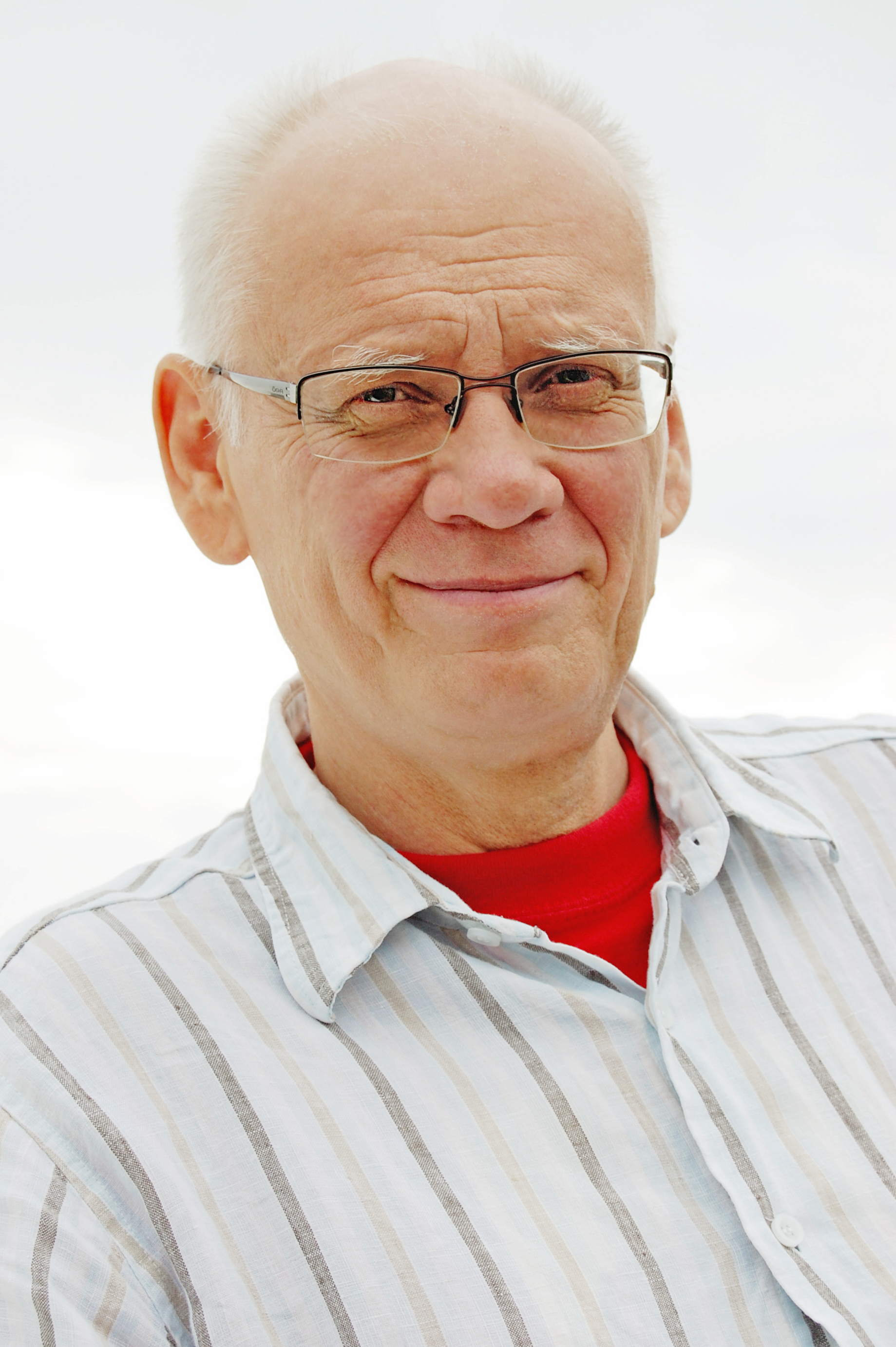
- Born: 22 June 1952 (age 74); Częstochowa, 1952
- Education: Jagiellonian University
- Occupations: Journalist author translator
- Years active: 1978–present
- Notable credit(s): Tygodnik Powszechny (1988–1999); Polityka (1999–)
- Spouse: Marta Szostkiewicz
- Awards: Officer's Cross

Adam Dawid Szostkiewicz (Polish pronunciation: [adam ʂɔstkʲɛvit͡ʂ]; born 22 June 1952) is a Polish author, commentator on religion and politics, journalist and translator.

== Biography ==
Szostkiewicz was born in Częstochowa. He studied Polish language and literature in the early seventies at Jagiellonian University. He was active in the Polish political opposition against the authoritarian rule, joined the Solidarity movement for human and workers’ rights as well as democracy and independence from the USSR.

He was imprisoned after Martial law in Poland against Solidarity was imposed by a Military Junta in December 1981. After his release six months later, he remained part of the Solidarity underground. In 1988, he joined Tygodnik Powszechny, a liberal Catholic weekly in Kraków as Political Editor. He was spokesman for the 1990 presidential campaign of Polish Prime Minister Tadeusz Mazowiecki. In the early nineties he was a producer in the BBC Polish Section. John Simpson of the BBC invited him to be his guest in one of the episodes of Simpson's World documentary series when he came to Poland to talk about John Paul II and Polish Catholicism. After the death of the longtime editor of Tygodnik Powszechny, Jerzy Turowicz in 1999, he joined the staff of Polityka weekly news magazine in Warsaw, where he writes about the Roman Catholic Church in Poland and worldwide and other religions in the wider contexts of culture and society, as well as on international relations and literature. He is often quoted and interviewed on modern religious issues. Occasionally his work appears in openDemocracy.net. His translations include Eichmann in Jerusalem by Hannah Arendt, co-translations of two volumes of Ko Un's poems, and a co-translation of a book of poetry by Gary Snyder.

In 2014, President Bronisław Komorowski awarded him the Officer's Cross of the Order of Polonia Restituta for outstanding achievements in the democratic transformation of Poland as well as for his contribution to the development of free media and independent journalism.

He is married to radio journalist Marta Szostkiewicz, and they have two grown daughters.
