= Wojciech Trzciński =

Polish musician (1949–2025)

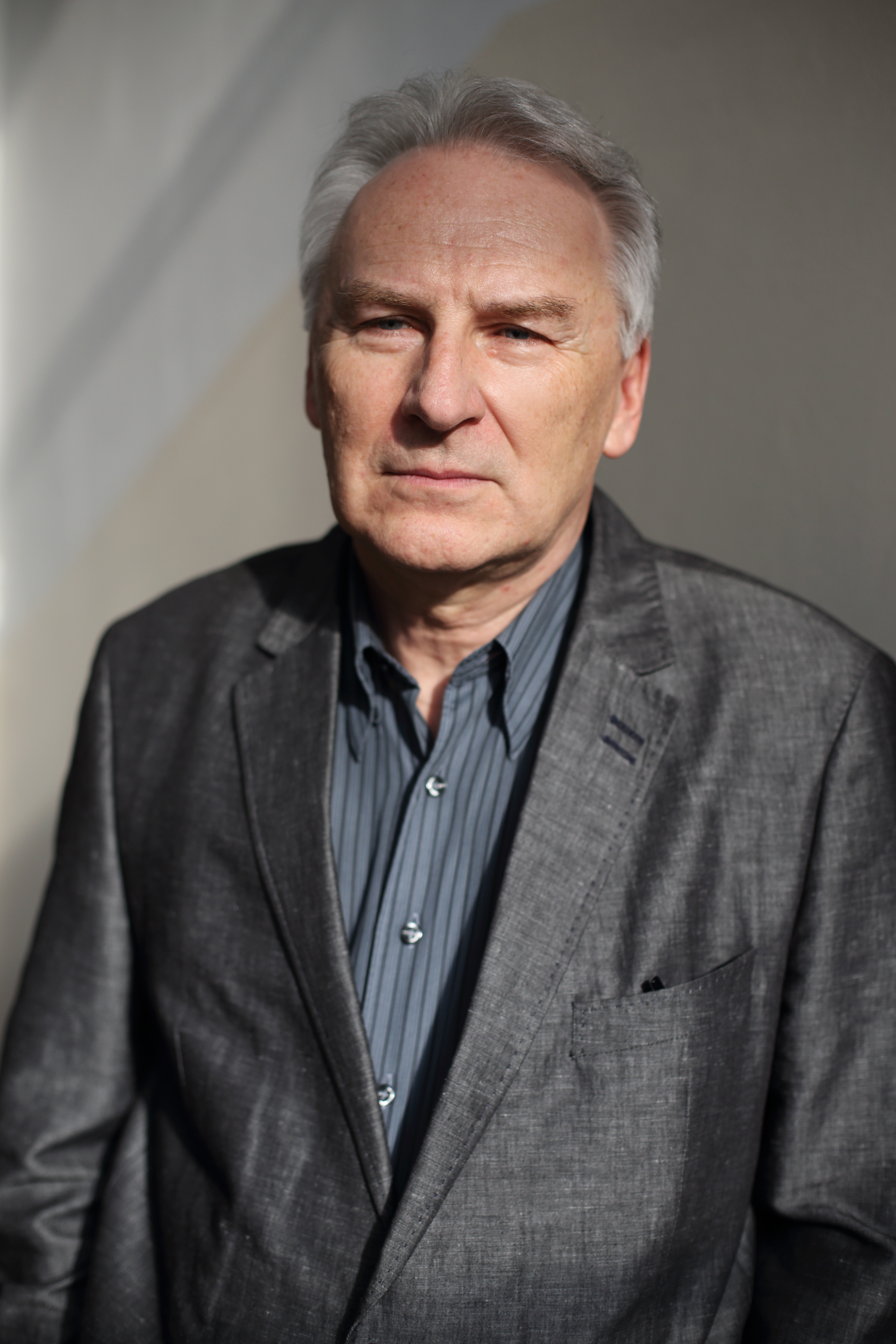
- Trzciński in 2017
- Born: 22 July 1949; Warsaw, Poland
- Died: 1 February 2025 (aged 75)
- Education: Stephen Báthory 2nd High School (Warsaw), University of Warsaw
- Occupations: Composer, pianist, guitarist, conductor
- Awards: Gold Gloria Artis; Bronze Gloria Artis

Wojciech Trzciński at the photographic exhibition of Marek Karewicz in Skwer venue, Warsaw, Poland.

Wojciech Stanisław Trzciński (22 July 1949 – 1 February 2025) was a Polish composer, arranger, pianist, guitarist, conductor and music producer.

Trzciński was a graduate of the Stephen Báthory 2nd High School (Warsaw) and the University of Warsaw. Author of music for films, television programs, theater performances, and composer of songs for many Polish performers. Artistic director of festivals in Opole and Sopot. One of the originators of the Polish Phonographic Industry Award Fryderyk. Founder of a private, independent art center Fabryka Trzciny for whose creation he received the Paszport Polityki and the Kisiel Prize.

Chairman of the Management Board and CEO of Hanna-Barbera Poland (1987–93), founder and editor-in-chief of the monthly magazine Video Świat Hanna-Barbera (1990–92).

== Life and career ==
Trzciński made his debut in 1969 at the Student Song Fair in the Medyk club in Warsaw as a singer and composer. Initially, he composed songs for student performers such as Natasza Czarmińska, Piotr Fronczewski, Andrzej Nardelli and Magda Umer. Later he started writing for Radio Song Studio and Television Giełda Piosenki, among others for artists such as: Halina Frąckowiak, Edyta Geppert, Anna Jantar, Irena Jarocka, Krzysztof Krawczyk, Krystyna Prońko, Urszula Sipińska and Zdzisława Sośnicka. He was the composer of the oratorio Kolęda-Nocka, the musical Azyl, and the musical fairy tale The Snow Queen.

Together with Ryszard Poznakowski co-created the children's musical Smurfowsiko.

He composed music for theater performances and feature films. He collaborated as an arranger and conductor with the duo Marek i Wacek. He provided artistic supervision over song festivals in Opole (1985), Sopot (1986–1987) and Vitebsk (1988).

From 1993 to 1995, he was the artistic director of the Musical Theater in Gdynia. From 1994 to 1996, he served as music director of Polskie Radio Program I. From 1996 to 1998, he was deputy director of TVP1. In 1997, he became the producer of the Opole concert Zielono mi, directed by Magda Umer, dedicated to the work of Agnieszka Osiecka. A year later he supervised the O! concert. Polish songs, organized on the occasion of the 35th anniversary of the National Festival of Polish Song in Opole. In 1999, he became the creator of a new formula, Sopot International Song Festival. In 2003, he founded the art center Fabryka Trzciny in Praga-Północ in Warsaw.

Trzciński died on 1 February 2025, at the age of 75.
