= Kisiel Prize =

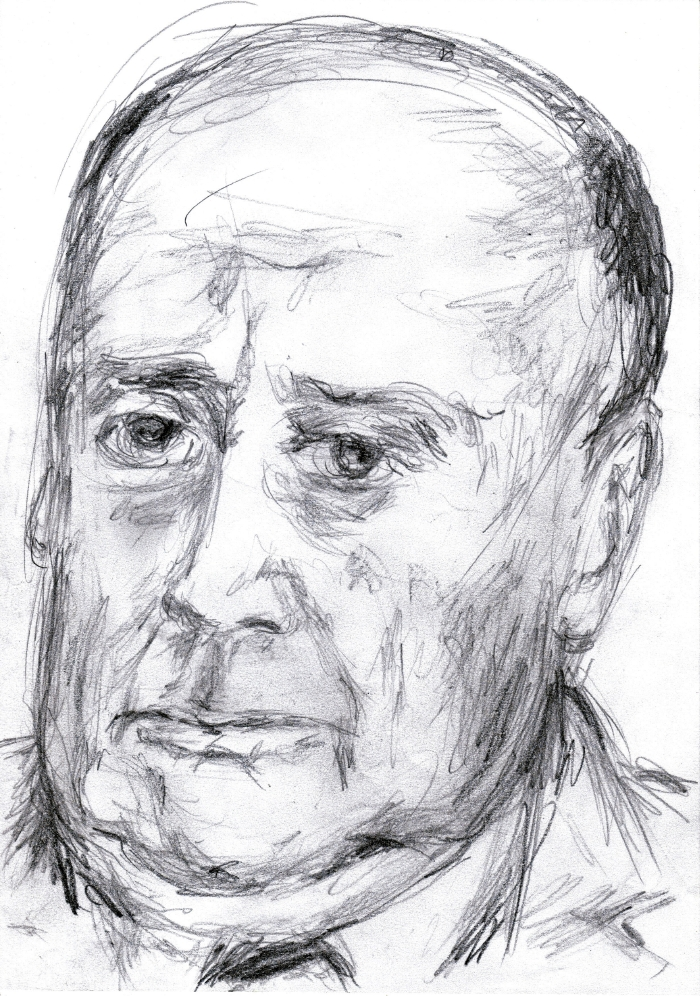
- Stefan Kisielewski
- Awarded for: Outstanding achievements in business, economics and journalism
- Country: Poland
- Presented by: Kisiel Prize Committee and Wprost magazine
- First award: 1990

Kisiel Prize or Kisiel Award (Polish: Nagroda Kisiela) is an annual Polish award presented in three categories: publicist, politician/public figure and entrepreneur whose actions most closely portray the spirit and beliefs of the Polish publicist and politician, Stefan Kisielewski (1919-1991).

== History ==
The award was established in 1990 by Kisielewski himself, with support of a major Polish weekly newspaper, Wprost. Since Kisielewski's death in 1991, the award is being given out with the agreement of the group composed primarily of former winners of the award, Stefan Kisielewski's son Jerzy Kisielewski, and (until 2006) former Wprost's editor-in-chief Marek Król.

In 2007, 2008, and 2009 the award was not given out, which caused some controversy, as many former winners criticized Wprost for drifting away from Kisielewski's views.

== Winners ==
2017 – Jadwiga Emilewicz, Jarosław Kaczyński, Ryszard Pieńkowski, Mariusz Szataniak and Paweł Szataniak

2016 – Paweł Kukiz, Andrzej Zarajczyk, Paweł Jabłoński

2015 – Andrzej Rzepliński, Adam Boniecki, Adam Kiciński, Marcin Iwiński

2014 – Paweł Lisicki, Ryszard Florek

2013 – Jacek Rostowski, Adam Michnik, Dariusz Miłek

2012 – Tadeusz Mazowiecki, Joanna Solska, Tomasz Zaboklicki

2011 – Elżbieta Bieńkowska, Janina Paradowska, Krystyna Janda

2010 – Andrzej Mleczko, Jerzy Buzek, Krzysztof Olszewski

2009 – no award

2008 – no award

2007 – no award

2006 – Marek Safjan, Wojciech Trzciński, Roman Młodkowski

2005 – Lech Wałęsa, Ryszard Krauze, Tomasz Lis

2004 – Jerzy Hausner, Teresa Bogucka, Adam Krzanowski

2003 – Jan Rokita, Roman Kluska, Janusz A. Majcherek

2002 – Krzysztof Pawłowski, Donald Tusk, Maciej Rybiński

2001 – Stanisław Ciupiński, Jan Kułakowski, Rafał Aleksander Ziemkiewicz

2000 – Irena Eris, Witold Gadomski, Andrzej Olechowski

1999 – Jan Nowak-Jeziorański, Paweł Piskorski, Wiesław Uchański

1998 – Henryka Bochniarz, Stanisław Tym, Hanna Gronkiewicz-Waltz

1997 – Marian Krzaklewski, Tomasz Wołek, Czesław Apiecionek

1996 – Andrzej Bączkowski, Sobiesław Zasada, Michał Zieliński

1995 – Władysław Bartoszewski, Andrzej Woyciechowski, Antoni Majewski

1994 – Leszek Balcerowicz, Jacek Fedorowicz, Mieczysław Prószyński

1993 – Aleksander Kwaśniewski, Janusz Lewandowski, Józef Tischner

1992 – Jerzy Giedroyć, Jan Kulczyk, Jan Winiecki

1991 – Bogusław Bagsik, Jan Krzysztof Bielecki, Jerzy Grohman

1990 – Janusz Beksiak, Stefan Bratkowski, Janusz Korwin-Mikke, Rafał Krawczyk, Piotr Kuncewicz, Stefan Kurowski, Józef Kuśmierek, Jacek Maziarski, Krzysztof Mętrak, Kazimierz Pytko, Ernest Skalski, Jerzy Waldorff, Wiesław Walendziak, Piotr Wierzbicki, Mieczysław Wilczek, Wacław Wilczyński

== See also ==
- Culture of Poland
- History of Poland
- Economy of Poland
