= Serbia Prison, Warsaw =

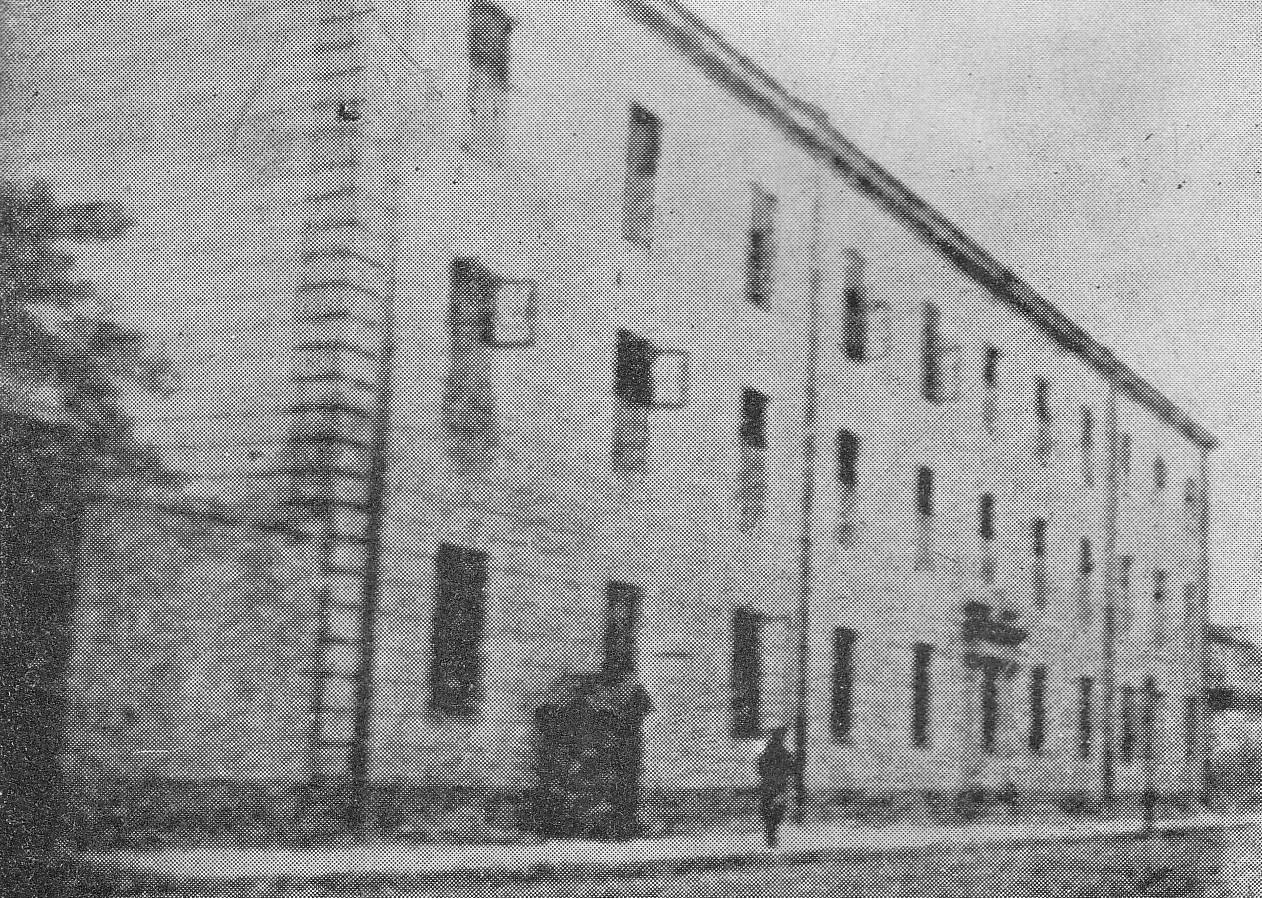
Serbia Prison before 1944.

Serbia Prison was the women's ward of the Pawiak prison, which in 1835-1944 was located at 24/26 Dzielna Street in Warsaw.

== History ==
The building was built between 1830 and 1835 to be a criminal prison for women. From 1877 to 1878 it served as a military hospital, and acquired its name because of the Russo-Turkish War (1877–78) (also known as the Serbian war). After 1863 the building was a political prison for women, and among the prisoners were, Hanka Ordonówna, Ina Benita, Irena Iłłakowicz, Lidia Wysocka, Maja Berezowska, Maria Koszutska, Maria Rutkiewicz, Mary Berg, Nathalie Zand, Pola Gojawiczyńska, Teresa Bogusławska, Zofia Chądzyńska, and Zofia Kossak-Szczucka.

The residents of Warsaw usually referred to the entire prison complex as Pawiak, i.e. both Pawiak itself (the men's wing) and Serbia (the women's wing).

From 1939 to 1944, Serbia together with the whole Pawiak were seized by the Nazi Gestapo and continued to help in the repression of Warsaw. On 21 August 1944 the Germans blew up the prison.

After the war the area of Serbia was partially used for the construction of Marchlewskiego Street (today Jan Pawla II Avenue). In 1965, a plaque was placed commemorating the place which housed Serbia.

== Bibliography ==
- Encyklopedia Warszawy (in Polish), edited by Bartłomieja Kaczorowski. Ed. I PWN. Warsaw 1994. ISBN 83-01-08836-2, p 623
