= Henryk Orfinger =

Polish entrepreneur (born 1951)

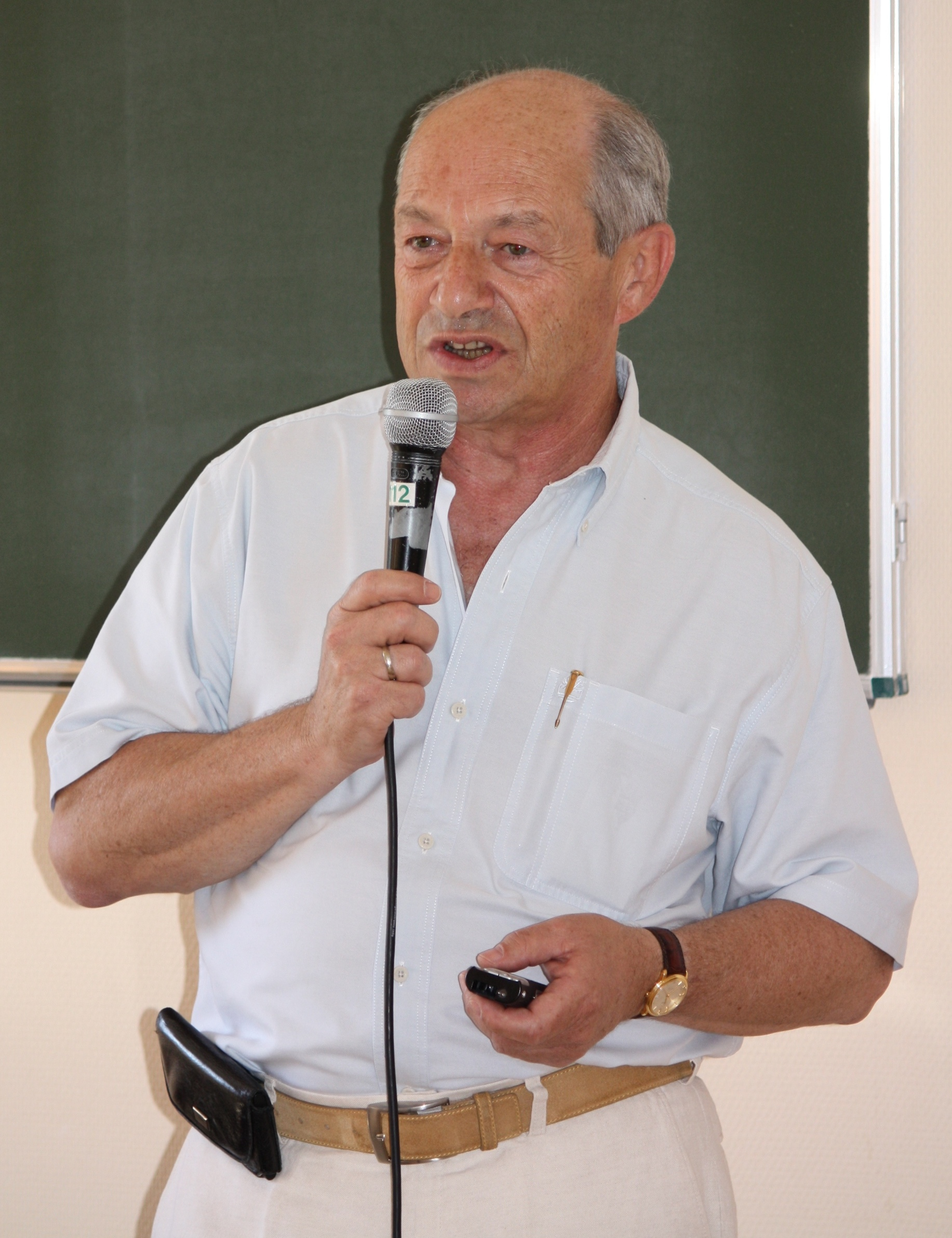
- Born: 28 June 1951 (age 75)
- Occupation: entrepreneur
- Awards: Officer's Cross of the Order of Polonia Restituta

Henryk Orfinger (born 28 June 1951 in Warsaw) is a Polish entrepreneur. He is the president of the management board at the cosmetic firm Dr. Irena Eris and holds several positions in Polish business institutions. Together with his wife, Irena Eris, he is listed within the 100 richest Poles in 2013 by the Polish edition of Forbes Magazine.

== Biography ==
Orfinger graduated at the Warsaw University of Technology (Faculty of Transportation). In 1983, with his wife, Irena Szołomicka-Orfinger, he founded the cosmetic company Dr. Irena Eris.

He holds several positions in non-government institutions. He is a board member at the Polish Association of the Cosmetic Industry (Polski Związek Przemysłu Kosmetycznego) and chairman of the supervisory board of the Polish Confederation of Private Employers Lewiatan (Polska Konfederacja Pracodawców Prywatnych Lewiatan). He runs the jury for the Galeria Chwały Polskiej Ekonomii award.
