= Union of Socialist Youth (Poland) =

Union of Socialist Youth Związek Młodzieży Socjalistycznej
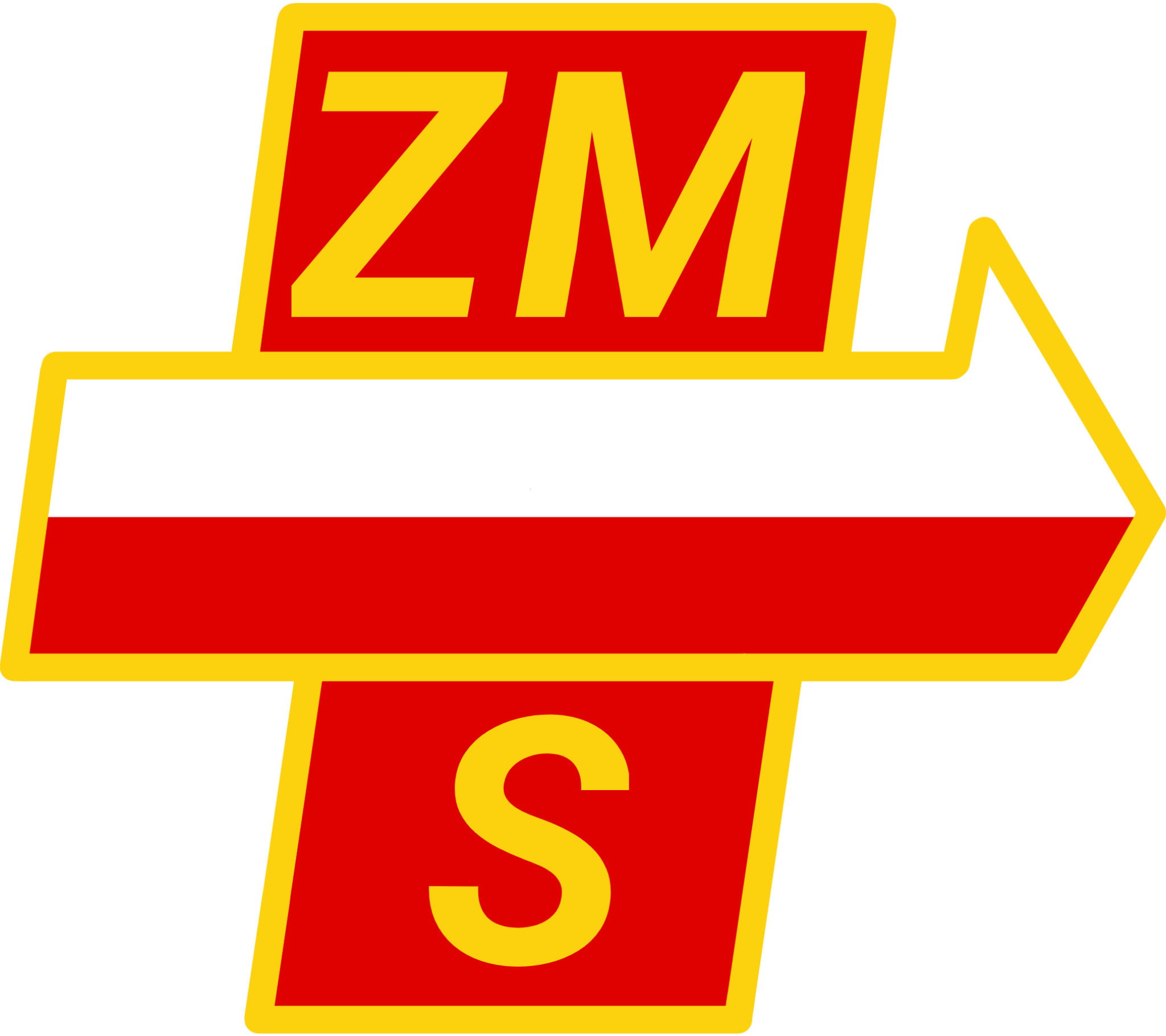
- Founded: 10 September 1957
- Preceded by: Union of Polish Youth
- Dissolved: 1976
- Merged into: Polish Socialist Youth Union
- Headquarters: Warsaw, Polish People's Republic
- Membership: 1.2 million (1975)
- Ideology: Socialism, Communism
- Mother party: Polish United Workers' Party
- National affiliation: Front of National Unity
- International affiliation: World Federation of Democratic Youth (WFDY)
- Newspaper: Sztandar Młodych

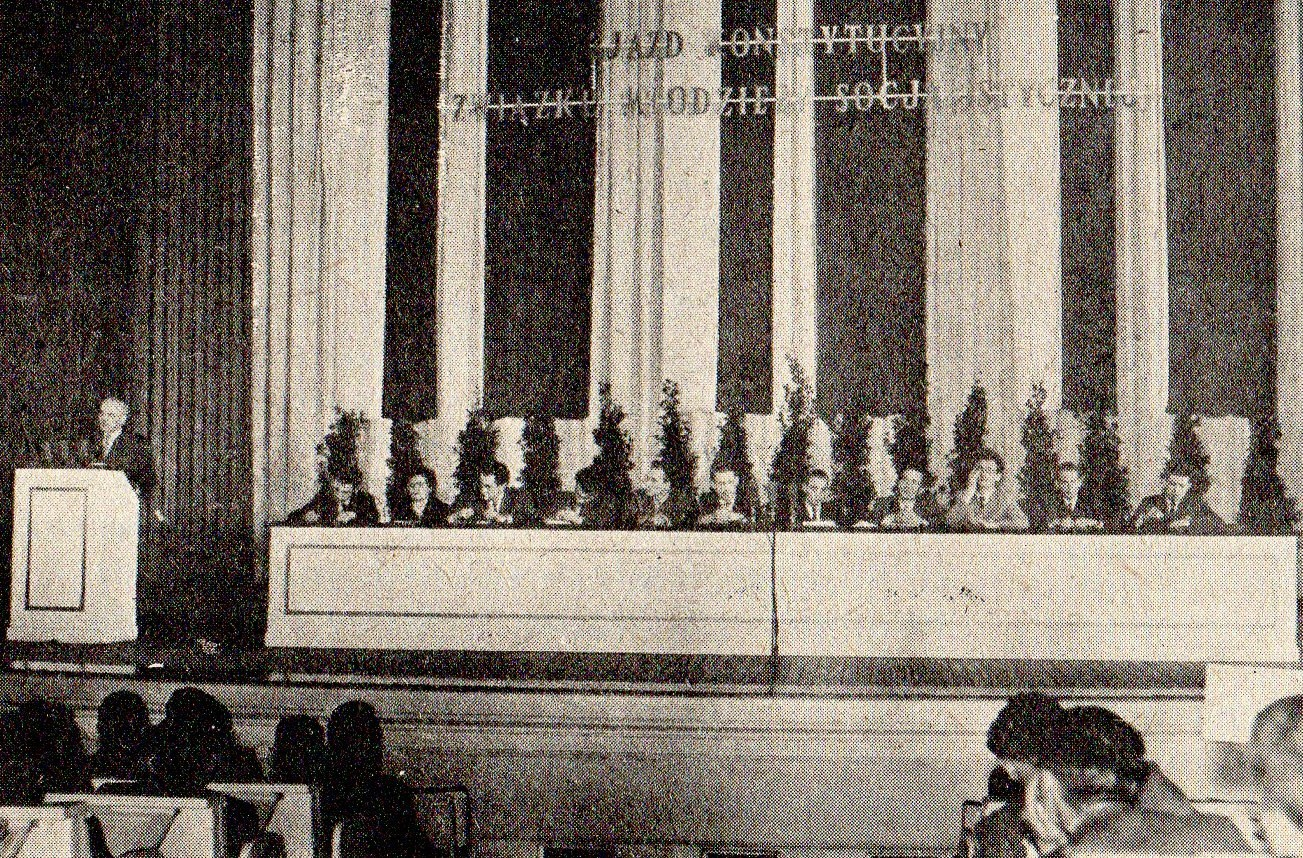
Founding congress in 1957

Union of Socialist Youth (Polish: Związek Młodzieży Socjalistycznej) (ZMS) was a Communist youth movement, the main youth organization in the Polish People's Republic from 1957 to 1976 when it was merged with two other organizations to create the Polish Socialist Youth Union.

== History ==
The organization was established in December 1957 as a successor of Union of Polish Youth. the ZMS was ideologically, politically and organizationally subordinate to the PZPR.

The main goal of the ZMS activity was to prepare members to join the Polish United Workers' Party. Like the previous organization, the Union of Polish Youth, the ZMS aimed to increase the organization's numbers, using mass forms of recruitment of new members bordering on coercion. In 1976, the ZMS initiated the creation of the ZSMP, the creation of which ended the ZMS's activity.

In 1957, the ZMS had 70 thousand members, in 1960 - 370 thousand, in 1964 - 800 thousand, in 1975 - 1.2 million.
