= Jan Krasicki =

Polish resistance fighter

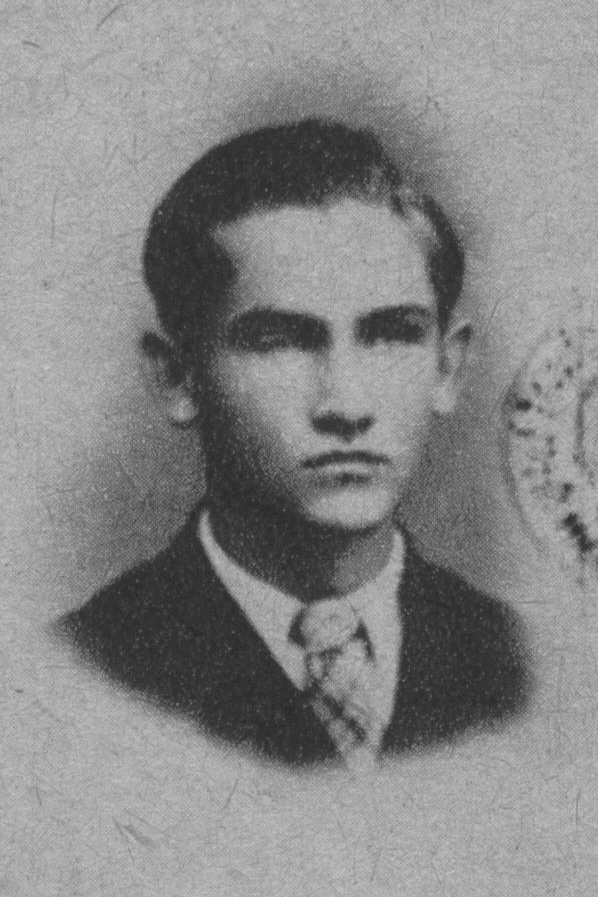
- Portrait of Krasicki prior to 1938

Member of the Sejm
- In office 17 November 1930 – 8 September 1935
- President: Ignacy Mościcki
- Prime Minister: Józef Piłsudski (1930); Walery Sławek (1930-31); Aleksander Prystor (1931-33); Janusz Jędrzejewicz (1933-34); Leon Kozłowski (1934-35); Walery Sławek (1935)
- Parliamentary group: BBWR

Personal details
- Born: 18 September 1919 Sowliny, Kraków Voivodeship, Second Polish Republic
- Died: 2 September 1943 (aged 23) Stadtmitte, Warschau, General Government
- Cause of death: Murdered by Gestapo
- Resting place: Powązki Military Cemetery
- Resistance
- Allegiance: Third International
- Branch: People's Guard; ZWM
- Service years: 1939-1943
- Rank: Podpułkownik
- Nickname: Kazik
- Conflict: Second World War
- Awards: Order of the Cross of Grunwald; Cross of Merit

Signature
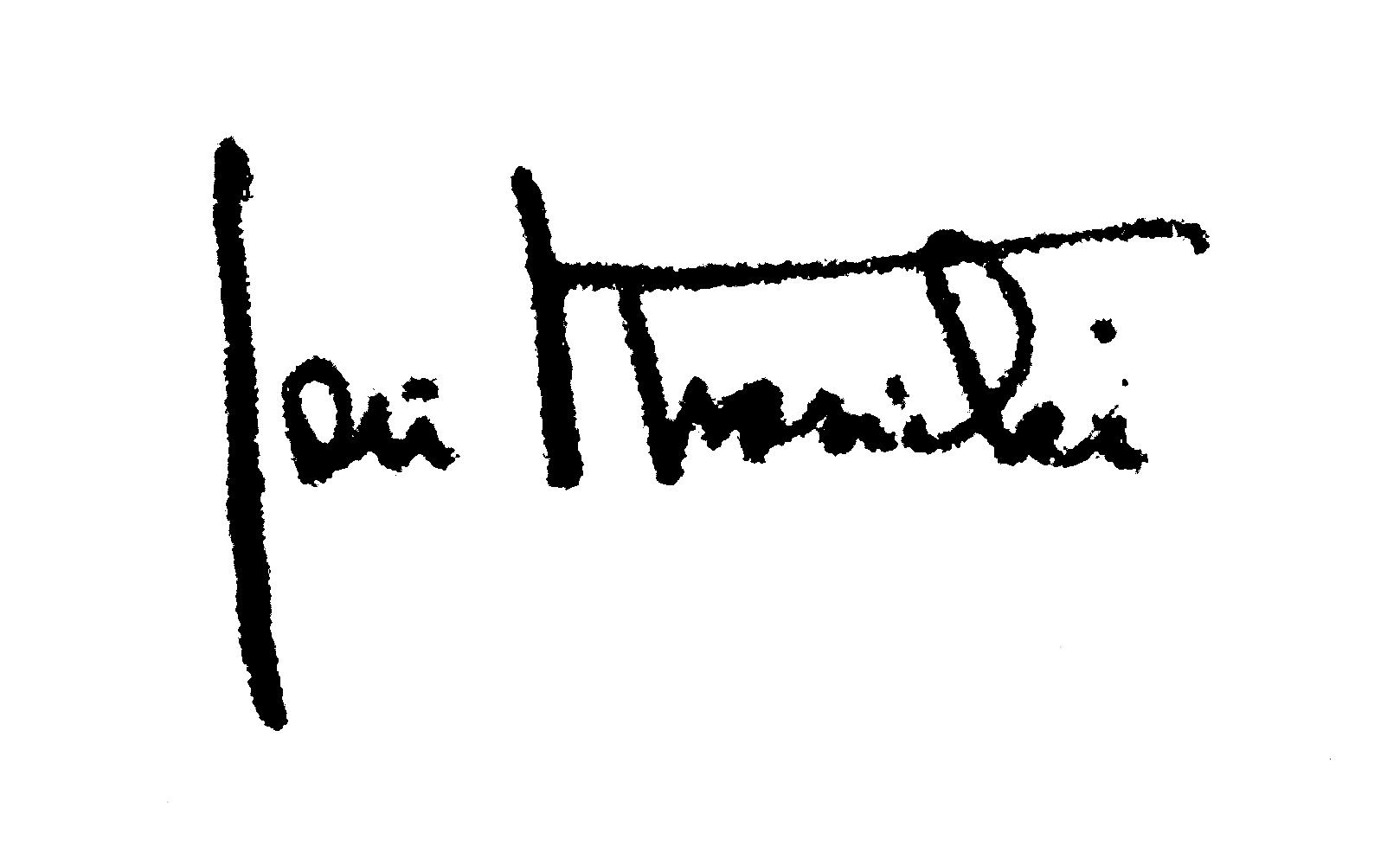

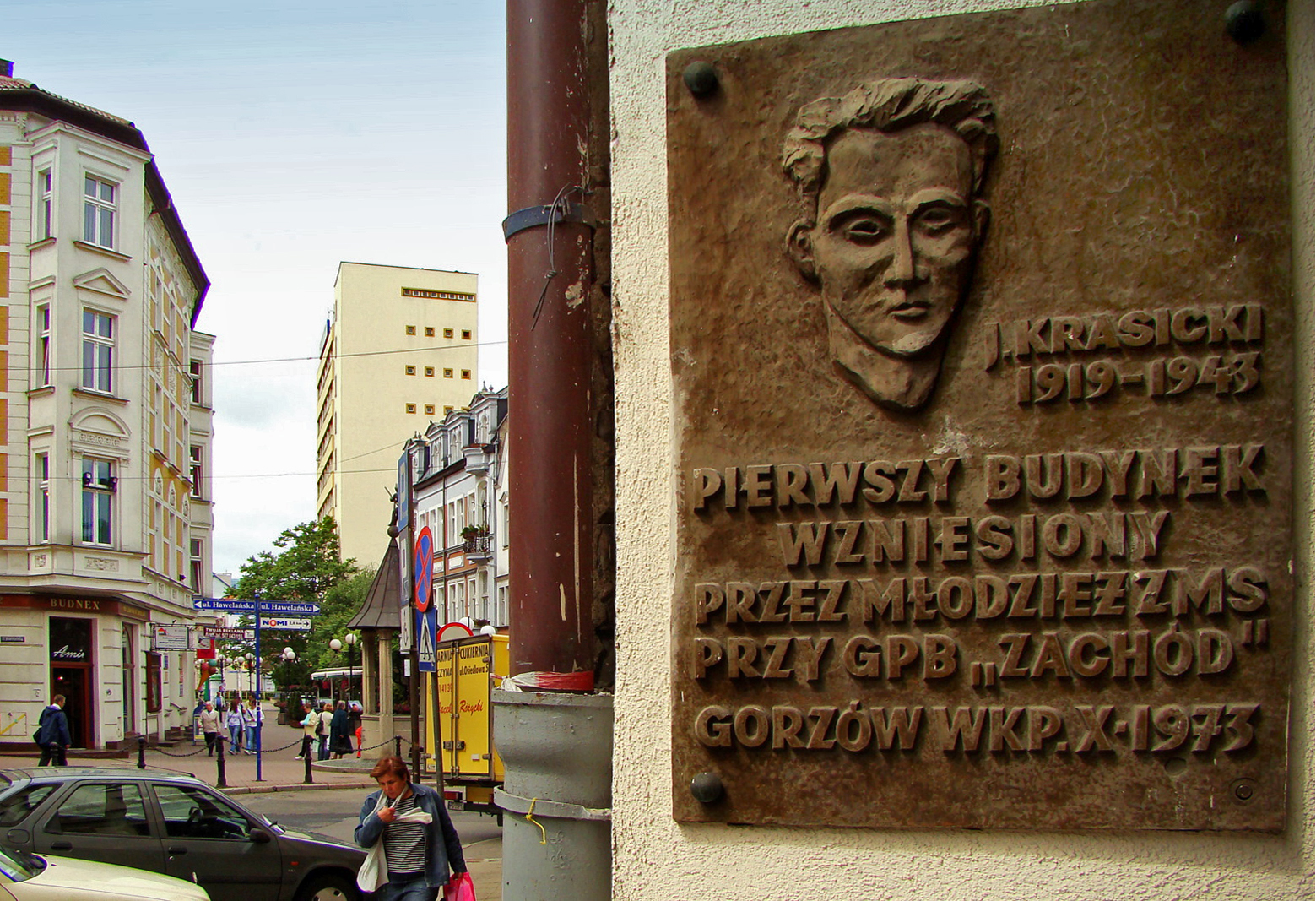
Commemorative plaque of Jan Krasicki on a building in Gorzów Wielkopolski, 1973

Janek "Jan" Krasicki (18 September 1919 – 2 September 1943) was a Polish activist of the Communist youth movement and resistance fighter.

== Biography ==
Krasicki was born in to the family of a prominent Polish lawyer and politician. After finishing his secondary education, he joined the Communist Party of Western Belarus towards and in 1937 he began studying law at the University of Warsaw. There he joined the Socialist Youth Organization "Życie", which was under the influence of the illegal Communist Party of Poland and the Communist Union of Polish Youth. He also established direct contacts with activists of the KPP. As a result of a fight with nationalist activists he was arrested and expelled from the University of Warsaw.

After the Soviet occupation of Lviv, Krasicki was admitted to the Law Faculty of the Ivan Franko State University of Lviv. He became the chairman of the Trade Union of Students and Academics of the Law Faculty and from 1940 he became a member of the Soviet Komsomol, where he worked closely with Soviet intelligence.

After the outbreak of the German-Soviet war in June 1941, he was evacuated to the east together with the authorities of the Lviv Komsomol. In Moscow, he was selected for a group of Poles who were to be transferred to Poland to carry out sabotage tasks. He was included in the so-called second initiative group, which, after being transferred to the country on May 20, 1942, joined the leading cadres of the communist underground which founded Polish Workers' Party (PPR) and the People's Guard (GL).

From June 1942 to March 1943 he was the head of radio communications of the PPR Central Committee with Moscow and a member of a special militia subordinate to the party authorities. He took part in various types of GL armed actions, including the heist on the Municipal Savings Bank in Warsaw on November 30, 1942, in which huge funds were obtained for conspiratorial and propaganda activities.

From June 1942 to March 1943 he was the head of radio communications of the PPR Central Committee with Moscow and a member of a special militia subordinate to the party authorities. He was also responsible for the military training of the GL soldiers. It is believed that at the end of December 1942, on the orders of the PPR-GL leadership acting together with Mieczysław Hejman, he shot and killed the secretary of PPR, Bolesław Mołojec.

In the summer of 1943, on the orders of his superiors, he brought Bolesław Bierut to Warsaw. In 1943, he prepared the establishment of a youth annex of PPR, which was given the name of the Union of Youth Struggle, becoming its second chairman.

On September 2, 1943, he was arrested in an apartment on Jasna Street in Warsaw. After being taken out onto the street, he kicked one of the Gestapo officers and tried to escape, but was killed while fleeing capture. On May 9, 1945, he was buried at the Powązki Military Cemetery in Warsaw.

== Legacy ==
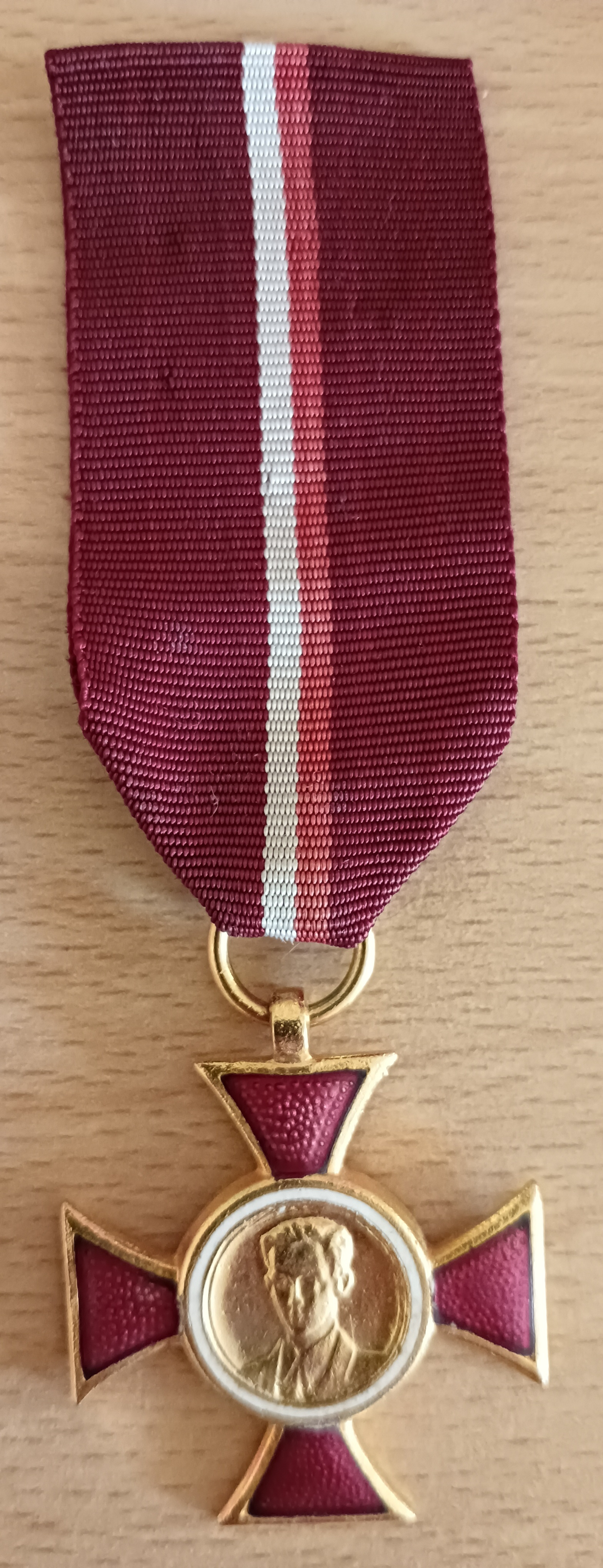
The Jan Krasicki Golden Cross of Merit

Jan Krasicki was posthumously awarded the Golden Cross of Merit. Krasicki also became the patron of the Union of Socialist Youth, which established the Jan Krasicki Cross as its award.

Throughout the existence of the Polish People's Republic, dozens of schools, parks and other establishment bore his name until 1990, after which most were renamed.
