= Janina Paradowska =

Polish journalist and presenter (1942–2016)

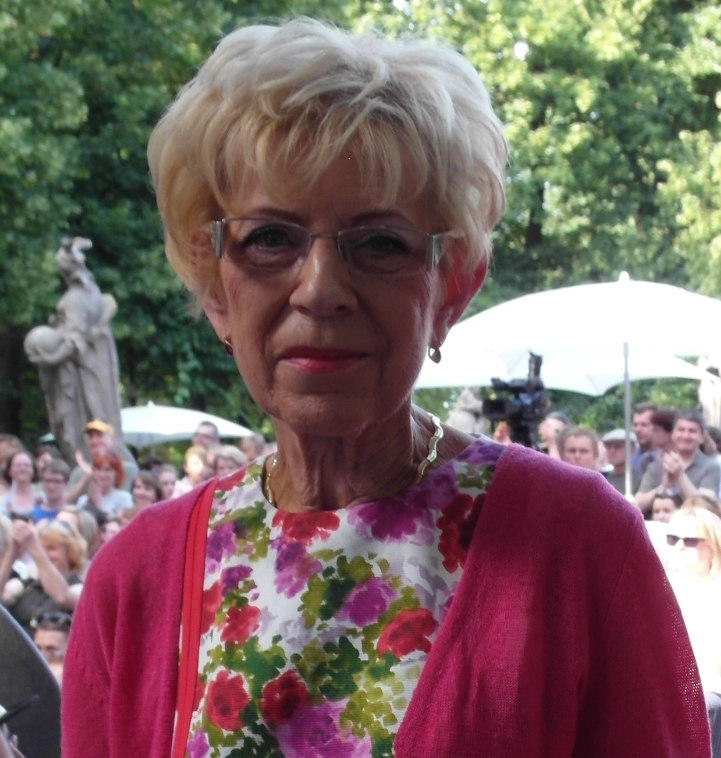
- Paradowska in 2013
- Died: 2016; Kraków, Poland
- Resting place: Rakowicki Cemetery

Janina Maria Paradowska-Zimowska (2 May 1942 – 29 June 2016) was a Polish journalist and radio presenter.

== Biography ==
Paradowska was born in Kraków. She graduated from the Faculty of Polish studies at Jagiellonian University, then studied postgraduate journalism at the University of Warsaw. She started working as a journalist of the Kuryer Polski daily, where she wrote about social issues.

She was a member of the Polish United Workers' Party. In the early 1980s, she was one of the heads of NSZZ "Solidarity". After the introduction of martial law in Poland in 1981, she resigned from the PZPR (Polish United Workers' Party). She was verified negatively, but after a few months she returned to work in the Kuryer Polski. In the same year, she started working in the editorial office of "Życie Warszawy", where, among others, she was the head of the political department. She also worked in the cultural and educational department. She resigned from Życie Warszawy in 1990.

In 1991 she joined the editorial team of "Polityka". She was a political commentator. She also worked with TVP, where from May 1993 to June 1994 she ran a hotline program on TVP1. From 2003 till her death, she was a radio journalist at Tok FM. From 2007 till her death she was running the program of the Paradowska Pond on air with Superstacja.

She taught journalism at Collegium Civitas.

In 2011 she published a book titled "A chciałam być aktorką" ("I wanted to be an actress").

She died in 2016. She was buried on 2 July 2016 at the Rakowicki Cemetery in Kraków.

== Awards and prizes ==
She received the Adolf Bocheński prize (1997), the Perpetual Foundation Award of Ksawery and Mieczysław Pruszyński (1999), Andrzej Urbańczyk (2004). In 2002 she was also awarded Golden Accreditation to the Sejm as the best journalist in the nationwide press.

Paradowska was also honored with the annual Grand Press award, namely the title of the best journalist in 2002. On the initiative of Renata Gluza from the monthly press, she was awarded an additional prize for her acting performance on 13 and 14 January 2007 at Warsaw's Kwadrat Theatre in the farce of Ray Cooney and John Chapman.

In 2011 she received the Kisiel Award.

== Personal life ==
Janina Paradowska was twice married, first to Tadeusz Stępień, journalist of Kuryer Polski, then to Jerzy Zimowski.
