= Anna Paradowska =

Australian engineer

- Education: Monash University; Wroclaw University of Technology; Australian Nuclear Science and Technology Organisation
- Scientific career
- Workplaces: Rutherford Appleton Laboratory
- Thesis: Investigation of residual stress in steel welds using neutron and synchrotron diffraction (2007)

Anna Paradowska is an Australian engineer who is Professor in Advanced Structure Materials at the Australian Centre for Neutron Scattering and the Australian Nuclear Science and Technology Organisation.

== Early life and education ==
Paradowska completed her master's degree in materials science at Wroclaw University of Technology. She moved to Monash University as a doctoral researcher, where she specialised in mechanical engineering and the development of strategies to study stress in steel welds. After earning her doctorate, she joined the Rutherford Appleton Laboratory working on the ENGIN-X beamline.

== Research and career ==
In 2011, Paradowska joined the Australian Nuclear Science and Technology Organisation. Paradowska develops neutron and synchrotron diffraction for residual stress analysis. She is interested in the welding process and developed the Kowari–Strain Scanner, looking to understand how the structure and stress in materials relate to they manufacturing process.

== Selected publications ==
- Paddea, S.; Francis, J.A.; Paradowska, A.M.; Bouchard, P.J.; Shibli, I.A. (February 2012). "Residual stress distributions in a P91 steel-pipe girth weld before and after post weld heat treatment". Materials Science and Engineering: A. 534: 663–672. doi:10.1016/j.msea.2011.12.024. ISSN 0921-5093.
- Robinson, J.S.; Tanner, D.A.; Truman, C.E.; Paradowska, A.M.; Wimpory, R.C. (March 2012). "The influence of quench sensitivity on residual stresses in the aluminium alloys 7010 and 7075". Materials Characterization. 65: 73–85. doi:10.1016/j.matchar.2012.01.005. hdl:10344/3780. ISSN 1044-5803.
- Gong, W.; Tomota, Y.; Adachi, Y.; Paradowska, A.M.; Kelleher, J.F.; Zhang, S.Y. (June 2013). "Effects of ausforming temperature on bainite transformation, microstructure and variant selection in nanobainite steel". Acta Materialia. 61 (11): 4142–4154. Bibcode:2013AcMat..61.4142G. doi:10.1016/j.actamat.2013.03.041. ISSN 1359-6454.
