= Jan Kułakowski =

Polish politician (1930–2011)

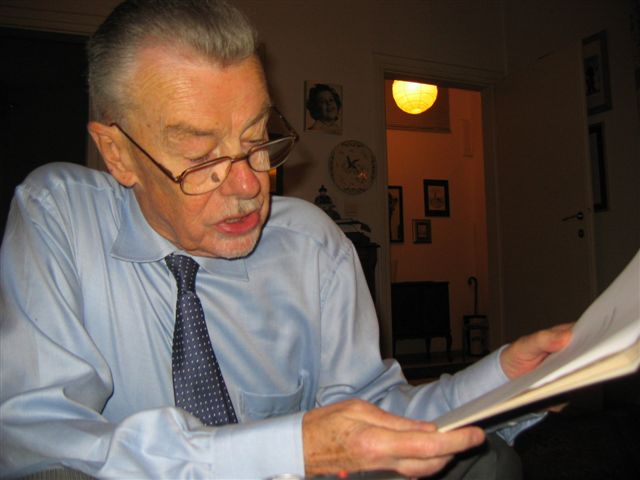
Jan Kułakowski

Jan Jerzy Kułakowski (25 August 1930 – 25 June 2011) was a Polish politician and Member of the European Parliament for the Greater Poland Voivodship (2004–2009) with the Freedom Union, part of the Alliance of Liberals and Democrats for Europe and sat on the European Parliament's Committee on Employment and Social Affairs.

Kułakowski was a substitute for the Committee on Development, a member of the Delegation to the ACP-EU Joint Parliamentary Assembly and a substitute for the Delegation for relations with the countries of the Andean Community.

Kulakowski was a Member of the National Council of the European Integration, Advisory Group appointed by President Aleksander Kwasniewski. He was a member of the Royal Institute of International Affairs in Belgium. He was the Vice-President of Association France-Pologne pour l’ Europe and the Polish Council of the European Movement.

== Education ==
- 1953: Doctor of Law, Catholic University of Leuven
- Work in radio (1953–54), Paris

== Career ==
- 1954–1957: Member of the General Secretariat of the International Federation of Christian Trade Unions
- 1974–1976: Secretary, General Secretary of the European Organisation of the International Federation of Christian Trade Unions
- Secretary of the European Trade Union Confederation
- 1976–1989: General Secretary, World Confederation of Labour
- 1990–1996: Ambassador extraordinary and plenipotentiary of the Republic of Poland, head of the Polish mission to the European Community
- 1998–2001: secretary of state in the Chancellery of the Prime Minister, government plenipotentiary for Poland's accession negotiations to the European Union
- Vice-Chairman of the Programme Board of the Polish Robert Schuman Foundation (since 1996)
- since 2004: Vice-Chairman of the Polish Council of the European Movement
- since 2003: Chairman of the Public Diplomacy Council
- since 2002: Vice-Chairman of the Franco-Polish Association for Europe
- Member of the National Council for European Integration, member of the Research Group to the President of the Polish Republic
- 2004–2009: Member of the European Parliament.

== Honours and awards ==
- Knight of the Order of the White Eagle (2002)
- Commander with Star of the Order of Polonia Restituta
- Grand Officer of the Order of Leopold II of Belgium
- Legion of Honour (France – January 19, 2007)
- Grand Officer of the Order of Merit of the Republic of Poland
- Official Patron of the International European School in Warsaw, which is also named after him. (2012)

In 2001, Kulakowski won the Kisiel Prize. He was a member of the Royal Institute of International Relations in Belgium.

Author and co-author of numerous reports, documents, articles and essays devoted to world’s trade union movement and issues resulting in bilateral relations of Poland and the European Union.

Jan Kulakowski was married to Zofia Kulakowska-Wajs. They had three daughters.

== See also ==
- 2004 European Parliament election in Poland
