= Nathalie Zand =

Polish neurologist (1883–1942)

Nathalie Zylberlast-Zand
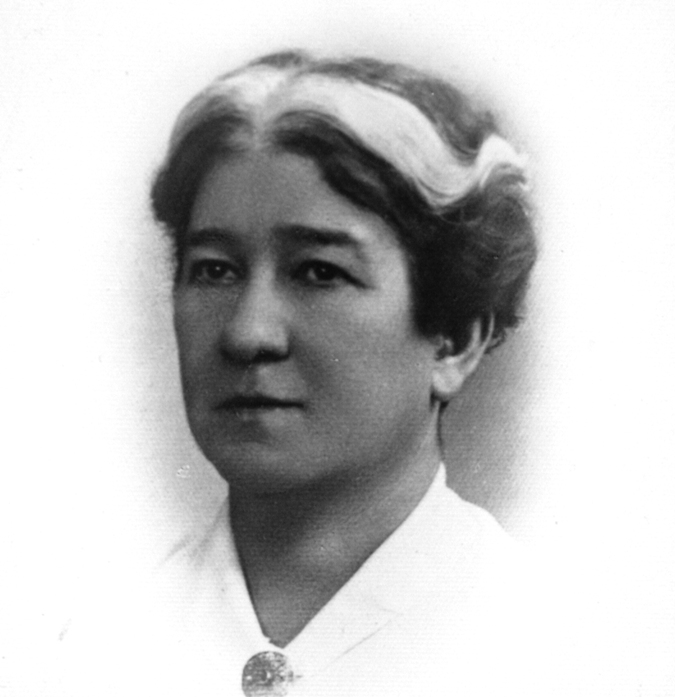
- Born: Nathalie Zylberlast; 28 March 1883; Warsaw, Poland
- Died: 23 or 24 September 1942; Pawiak prison, Warsaw
- Other name: Nathalie Zylberlast-Zandowa.
- Education: University of Geneva
- Occupation: Neurologist

Nathalie Zylberlast-Zand (1883–1942) was a Polish Jewish neurologist who died in a Nazi prison during World War II. She published research under several names including Nathalie Zylberlast-Zandowa.

== Biography ==
Nathalie Zyberlast was born 28 March 1883 (or 27 March 1884) in Warsaw, Poland, as the daughter of David Zylberlast and his wife Emilia (née Batawia).

In 1899, she graduated from the Second Women's Junior High School in Warsaw in 1899 and went on to earn her medical diploma from the University of Geneva, under the supervision of Edouard Martin, based on her dissertation Un cas de leucémie myéloïde chez un enfant de neuf mois (A case of myeloid leukemia in a nine month old child). In the same year, she passed the state examination at the National University of Kharkiv in Ukraine.

Zand conducted research and was a regular contributor to French medical journals. She worked closely with Edward Flatau, who is considered the founder of modern neurology. She worked at the Jewish Hospital in the Czyste neighborhood of Warsaw.

Her husband, Maksymilian Zand (1876–1932), was an industrialist and socialist activist.

During the Nazi occupation of Warsaw, Poland, during World War II, she was forced to live in the walled Warsaw ghetto with hundreds of thousands of other Jews. There, she continued to work as a physician. On the night of 23 to 24 September 1942, she was deported to the Pawiak prison in Warsaw, where, it is believed, she was executed and is considered one of many martyred Jewish physicians from Poland.

== Scientific achievements ==
For many years Zand worked with Flatau at the Jewish Hospital in Warsaw and as an assistant in his neurology laboratory.

During her career, Zand researched coma encephalitis, pyramidal pathways, lower olives, choroid plexus of the ventricles and post-cerebral rigidity, among other topics. She showed that meningitis in patients with organ tuberculosis follows a different course. In 1921, she co-authored with Flatau, research about three forms of meningeal reaction to tuberculosis infection.

In 1930, she published the book Les plexus choroïdes: Anatomie, physiologie, pathologie about the choroid plexus in the brain. Swiss-French neuropathologist Gustave Roussy wrote the French edition's foreword.

She was the first to describe the oculo-finger reflex in post-coma parkinsonism in 1930.

== Selected publications ==
Zand published books and more than 100 research papers using a variety of her names: Nathalie Zylberlast-Zand or Natalie Zylberlast-Zandowa or Nathalie Zand. In 1933, she published the novel Nowa Legenda (New Legend) under the pseudonym Maria Quieta.

- Zylberlast-Zand, Natalie. Le réflexe oculo-palpébral chez les parkinsoniens postencéphalitiques. Rev. neurol 1 (1923): 102-106.
- Zylberlast N. Un cas de leucémie myéloïde chez un enfant de neuf mois. Genève: Ch. Zœllner, 1907
- Zylberlast N. On mental disorders in serous meningitis . Polish Neurology p. 284, 1911/1912
- Zylberlast-Zand N. Sur la modification de la pression du liquide céphalo-rachidien sous l'influence du changement de position du corps et de la tête . Revue Neurologique 28: 1217–1221, 1921
- Zylberlast-Zandowa. The influence of the position of the body and the head pressure of cerebrospinal fluid . Polish Medical Journal 1 (3), pp. 35–37, 1921
- Zylberlast-Zandowa N. Common meningitis (menigitis cerebrospinalis epidemica). Warsaw: Ars medica Publishing Company, 1925.
- Zand N. Hysteria from the stand of Freud's theory . Military Doctor 9 (2), pp. 118–127, 1927
- Zylberlast-Zand N. Les olives bulbaires dans les états pathologiques . Revue Neurologique 36: Pt 2, pp. 196–203, 1929
- Zandowa N. Wpływ roztworów hipo- i hipertonicznych na tkankę nerwową i przestrzenie okołonaczyniowe. Warszawskie Czasopismo Lekarskie nr 30, 31, 32, 1930
- Zand N. Le psychisme de l′hypothalamus . Revue Neurologique, 71, pp. 38–41, 1939
