= Alfred Aberdam =

Polish painter

Alfred Aberdam (1894–1963) was a painter of School of Paris, born in Lviv, capital of Galicia, Austro-Hungarian Empire.

== Biography ==
Born in Lviv in 1894, in 1911 he started to study art at the Munich Academy. During World War I he was imprisoned by the Russians and stayed in the camp for prisoners of war in Siberia. In 1921 in Poland, he began his studies at Kraków's Academy of Fine Arts under Professor Teodora Axentowicz, then lived in Paris. There he participated in numerous exhibitions, and in a Poland exhibition in the Gallery of Modern Art Editions in 1929. In the latter he organized the exhibition in 1931. In 1932, he exhibited in Warsaw and Lviv. From 1933 he belonged to a group of visual artists known as "Nowocześni". In 1935 he took part in the exhibition of Polish artists in the Paris Galerie des Beaux-Arts. After World War II he made solo exhibitions in Paris (1952), London (1961) and Tel-Aviv (1962). He died in 1963 in Paris, and in 1970 in the Geneva Petit Palais arranged a retrospective exhibition of his art work.
