= Maria Rutkiewicz =

Polish communist, editor and radio operator

- Born: Maria Kamieniecka; 22 July 1917; Brest-Litovsk, Russian Republic
- Died: 27 June 2007 (aged 89)
- Burial place: Powązki Military Cemetery
- Political party: Initiative Group
- Other political affiliations: KPP
- Spouses: Jan Rutkiewicz (m. 1938; died 1945) Artur Starewicz (m. 1945, earliest)
- Awards: Medal of the 10th Anniversary of People's Poland
- Resistance
- Allegiance: Third International
- War: World War II

Maria Rutkiewicz (22 July 1917 – 27 June 2007) was a Polish communist and editor. During the Nazi occupation of Poland, she was a radio operator with the Polish resistance.

== Early years and World War II ==
Rutkiewicz was born in Brest-Litovsk (now Brest, Belarus) to Teresa and Mieczysław Kamieniecki in a well-educated, liberal family. Her older siblings were active in a socialist/communist circle and in 1936, she joined the Communist Party of Poland. In 1938, she and another active Party member, Wincenty Jan Rutkiewicz, known as "Wicek", were married. It was a difficult time. Joseph Stalin's Great Purge had eliminated a number of the Polish Communist Party's leaders and in 1939, Hitler invaded the country. Thousands of Polish soldiers were sent to German prisoner of war camps and there was an order to eliminate the Polish intelligentsia, that spelled out who was in danger.

The term Polish intelligentsia covers primarily Polish priests, teachers, lecturers, doctors, dentists, veterinary surgeons, officers, executives, businessmen, landowners, writers, journalists, plus all persons who have received a higher or secondary education.

— quoted in Peter Morley – A Life Rewound

With her husband, then a soldier, taken prisoner of war, Rutkiewicz fled to Białystok in Russian-occupied Poland. After Hitler invaded Russia in 1941, she fled to Moscow and was recruited into the initiative group of the Polish Workers' Party (PPR) and trained as a radio operator. She joined a cell of Polish communists led by Marceli Nowotko that was to parachute into Poland and work in the communist resistance. After one practice jump, the group landed outside Warsaw in the early hours of 28 December 1941. Her husband joined her in Warsaw, having escaped his imprisonment.

The Warsaw Ghetto Uprising was crushed in May 1943, the Nazis turned their attention to the Polish underground. All but one of Nowotko's cell were caught and shot. Wicek Rutkiewicz was arrested in July and sent to Auschwitz; in September 1943, the Gestapo burst in on a pregnant Rutkiewicz transmitting radio messages to Moscow. She was beaten, arrested and taken to Pawiak prison, but then brought back to Gestapo headquarters for interrogation, which included more beatings. The Gestapo told her that because of her condition, they would be humane and only beat her about the face. When she was returned to the prison, the supervisor was unable to recognize her.

Rutkiewicz had been told she would be shot. Meanwhile, she found out she was carrying twins. Polish doctors befriended her and persuaded the Germans to postpone her execution till after the babies were born, twins being a "medical opportunity" for Nazi doctors. Rutkiewicz gave birth on 16 February 1944 to a boy and a girl. She soon learned through the prison underground that her husband had no idea what had become of her and was desperately trying to find out. With the help of a criminal prisoner, she managed to have a photograph taken of herself with the babies, which she then was able to smuggle to her husband in Auschwitz. As the war progressed and the Nazis began to sense defeat, their focus was on destroying documents and the evidence of their crimes. Despite fears she would soon be executed, Maria Rutkiewicz was able to leave the prison with her babies in summer 1944.

Though her husband survived Auschwitz, he was murdered at Sachsenhausen at the end of the war. Rutkiewicz also lost her mother and two brothers. Her mother was shot by Nazis; one brother was killed in the army in 1939 and the other fought in the French resistance, was captured and murdered at Auschwitz.

== Postwar years ==
After the war, Rutkiewicz worked for the Central Committee of the PPR/PZPR and the Union of Polish Youth as a secretary, later becoming an editor. She worked at Iskra and Gromady.

She was later married to Artur Starewicz, Polish ambassador to the United Kingdom from 1972 to 1978, and lived in London. In 1978, she was featured in a British television series called Women of Courage about four women who risked their lives in standing up to the Nazis. The other women were Mary Lindell, a British woman; Sigrid Helliesen Lund, a Norwegian; and Hiltgunt Zassenhaus, a German.

Rutkiewicz died on 27 June 2007, at the age of 89.

== See also ==
- Polish resistance movement in World War II
