= Sztandar Młodych =

Polish newspaper

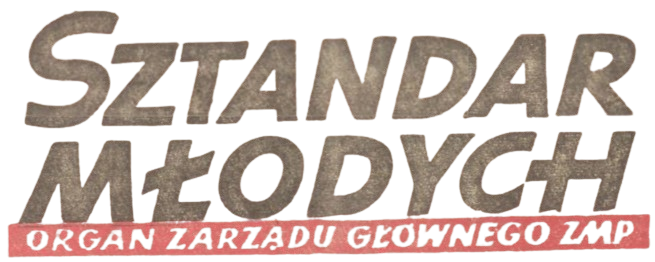

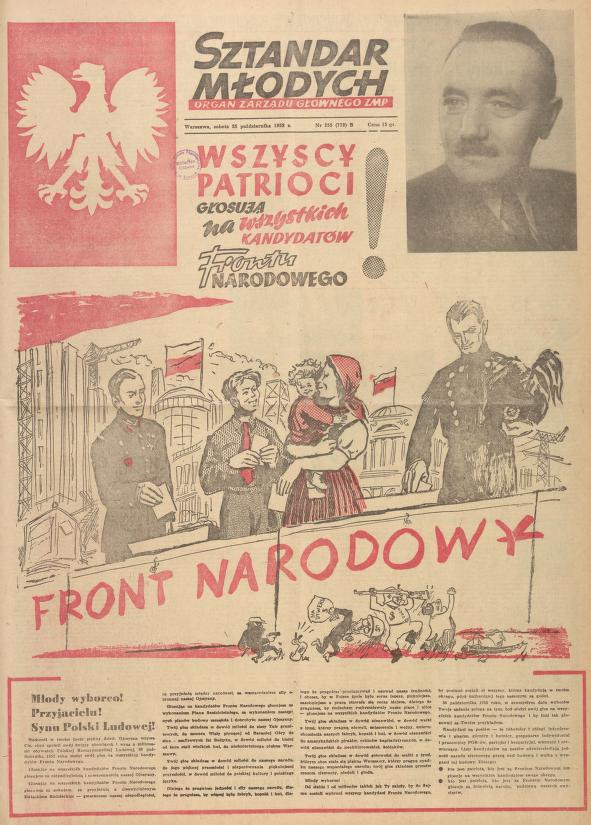
- Cover of №255 supporting the National Front in the parliamentary elections
- Owner(s): Union of Polish Youth (1950-7), Związek Młodzieży Socjalistycznej (1957-73), Federacja Socjalistycznych Związków Młodzieży Polskiej (1981-90), SM-Media (1990-4), and Marquard Media Polska (1994-7).
- Publisher: Prasa-Książka-Ruch
- Editor-in-chief: Stanisław Ludkiewicz, Irena Tarłowska, Marian Turski (1956-7), and Aleksander Kwaśniewski (1984-5).
- Founded: 1 May 1950
- Ceased publication: 25 July 1997
- Political alignment: Marxist-Leninist
- Language: Polish
- Headquarters: Warsaw
- City: Warsaw
- Country: Poland

Sztandar Młodych (transl. Standard for the Young) was published between 1950 and 1997 in Warsaw. It was a Polish communist, pro-Soviet propaganda newspaper aimed at a youth readership.

== History ==
The first issue of Sztandar Młodych was published on May Day 1950. Although the title of the newspaper reflected the era of Stalinism in which it emerged, throughout its history Sztandar Młodych often followed an independent editorial line contrary to that of the ruling party. The early editorial board was made up of a socially diverse range of journalists such as the Polish-Jewish holocaust survivor Henryk Flug who was given the job of Deputy Editor in its early days. Other early editors had previously been members of the Anders' Army, Berling's Army, Home Army and former Cursed soldiers during World War II, reflecting the paper's political diversity. On preparing the copy for the first issue of the paper, the Central Committee requested that its editor, Stanisław Ludkiewicz, include images of the Party's leadership. However, this use of portraits would serve to camouflage the paper's editorial mission to be a reader-focused publication.

== Contents ==
Sztandar Młodych engaged with youth concerns, such as debates over the fashion styles of the bikini boys that the paper focused on in the early-1950s.

== Legacy ==
Sztandar Młodych was an innovative publication, being the first Polish daily to adopt a Sunday magazine, styled on L'Humanité Dimanche. The publication has been seen as influential in training generations of journalists in Poland. In 2018, former journalists of Sztandar Młodych began research into an intended book detailing the history of the publication. On the seventieth anniversary of the first issue of Sztandar Młodych a commemorative conference was convened in Warsaw.
