= Polityka =

Polish weekly periodical

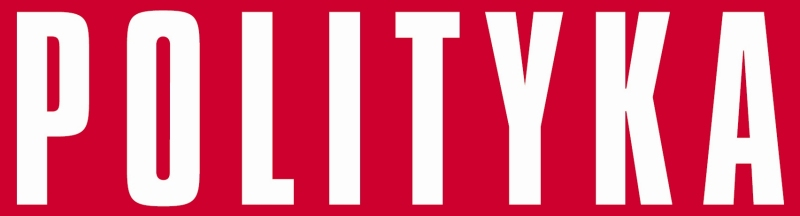

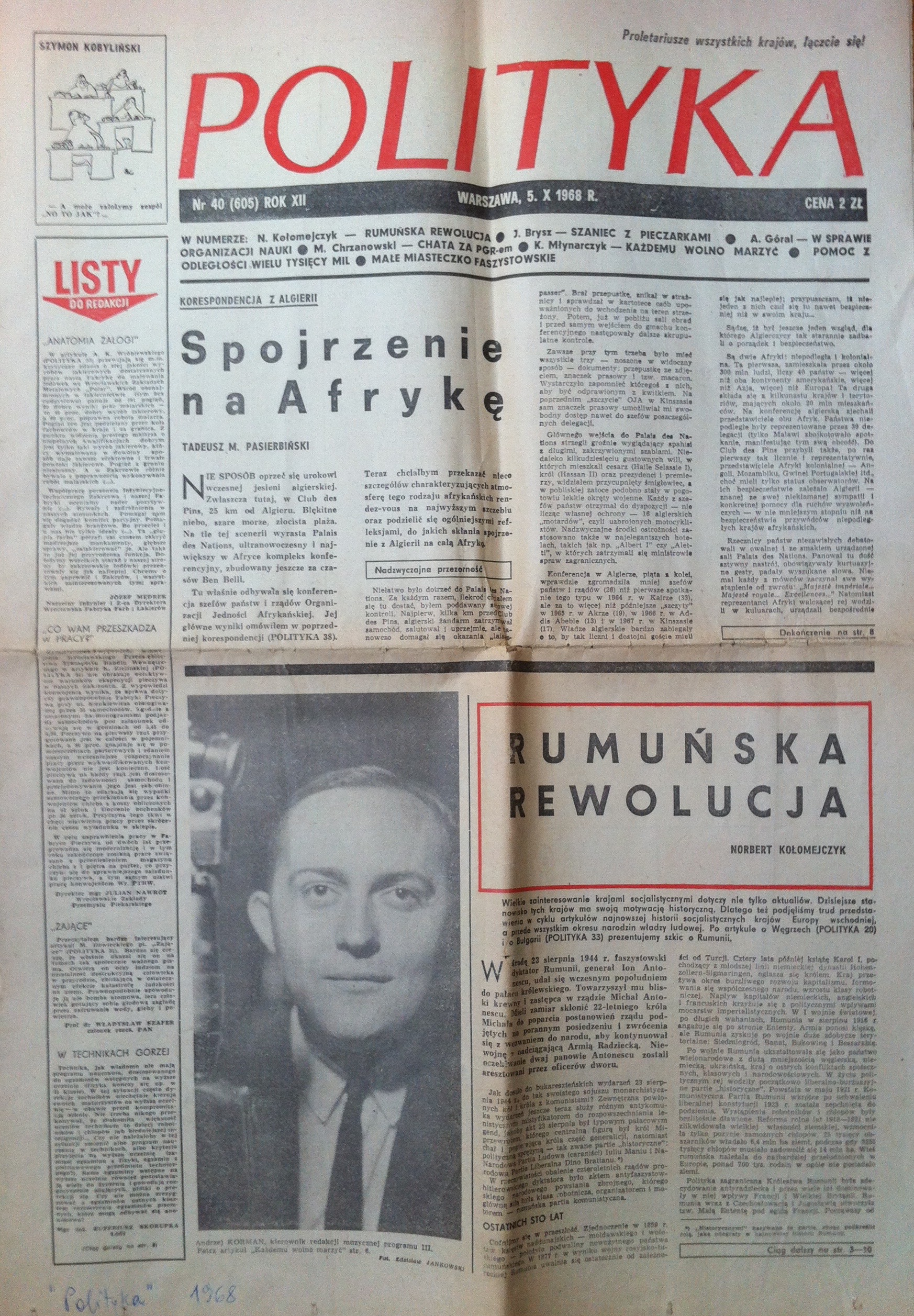
- Polityka cover for 5 October 1968
- Editor: pl:Jerzy Baczyński
- Frequency: Weekly
- Circulation: 182,000 (October 2016)
- Founded: 1957; 69 years ago
- Company: Spółdzielnia Pracy Polityka
- Country: Poland
- Website: polityka.pl

Polityka (Polish pronunciation: [pɔˈlitɨka], Politics) is a centre-left weekly news magazine in Poland. It had a circulation of 95,300 during 2021. Polityka has a socially liberal profile, targeting the intelligentsia, setting it apart from the more conservative Wprost and the glossier approach of Newsweek Polska.

Prominent editors and permanent contributors have included Adam Krzemiński, Janina Paradowska, Daniel Passent, Adam Szostkiewicz, Jacek Żakowski, Ryszard Kapuściński, Jerzy Urban, and Krzysztof Zanussi.

== History and profile ==
Established in 1957, after Stalinism had subsided in Poland, Polityka slowly developed a reputation for moderately critical journalism, promoting an economical way of thinking, although always remaining within the communist-imposed boundaries that still constrained the press. Notably, Polityka was launched to replace the more radically liberal Po prostu (1947–1957).

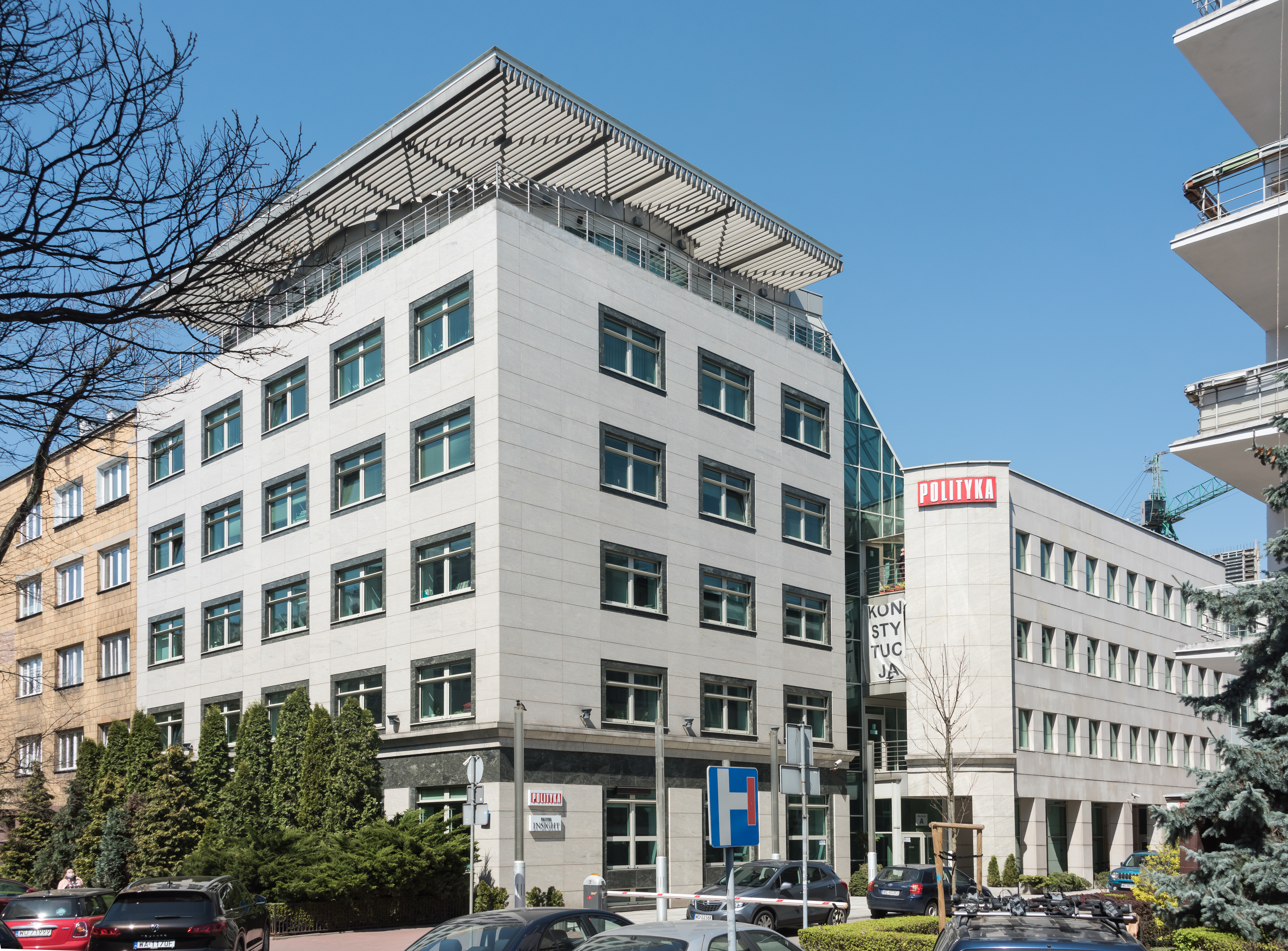
Polityka's headquarters in Warsaw.

The first editor-in-chief of Polityka was Stefan Żółkiewski who served in the post from 1957 to 1958. Mieczysław Rakowski was a long-time editor of the publication and he served in the post between 1958 and 1982. It was he who would become the final First Secretary of the Polish Communist Party, the last communist prime minister of Poland, and who would eventually oversee the winding down of communist rule in Poland in 1989. Polityka supported the Round Table talks, which concluded with an agreement to hold the free elections that would result in a peaceful end to communist rule in Poland. The magazine achieved renown in 1961 when it printed five parts of Adolf Eichmann's memoires that had been stolen and given to it by anti-Nazis (the only other magazine that acquired fragments of these memoires was Life). It earned the ire of the Soviet Ministry of Foreign Affairs in 1983 after expressing a favorable view of political pluralism.

Jan Bijak became editor-in-chief of the magazine in 1982 and served in the post until 1994. After the fall of communism in 1989, Polityka continued to play an influential role as part of Poland's newly free press. In 1990, the Polityka team left the state-owned publisher RSW Prasa-Książka-Ruch with rights to the title, and established an independent cooperative called "Polityka" – Spółdzielnia Pracy. Such a publishing cooperative is unique in the Polish press. Since 1994, the editor of Polityka has been Jerzy Baczyński. In 1995, the format was switched from a broadsheet to a standard colour magazine, which has more than 100 pages per issue.

== Circulation ==
In 2001 Polityka had a circulation of 245,000 copies. The circulation of the magazine was 143,089 copies in 2010 and 133,324 copies in 2011. It was 124,761 copies in 2012. The print and e-edition circulation of the weekly was 127,732 in August 2014.

== Awards ==
Since 1959, Polityka has awarded its History Award (for history book of the year), and, since 1993, an annual award for the arts, the Paszport Polityki. Since the late 1990s, it has also funded scholarships for young scientists.

== See also ==
- List of magazines in Poland
