= Union of Polish Youth =

Polish communist youth organization

Union of Polish Youth Związek Młodzieży Polskiej
- Founded: 1948
- Dissolved: 1956
- Succeeded by: Union of Socialist Youth
- Ideology: Communism; Marxism–Leninism; Stalinism
- Mother party: Polish United Workers' Party
- National affiliation: National Front
- International affiliation: WFDY
- Newspaper: Sztandar Młodych

Związek Młodzieży Polskiej (Union or Association of Polish Youth, abbr. ZMP) was a Polish communist youth organization, existing from 1948 to 1956. It was subordinated to the Polish United Workers' Party.

The organization was formally established on July 22, 1948, during the Congress of Unity of Polish Youth in Wrocław, when the youth organizations were united. The proposals for unification were put forward by activists of the communist youth organization, the Union of Youth Struggle, during the 1st nationwide Congress in September 1947. The result of the Congress of Unity was the liquidation of all youth organizations other than the ZMP.

For several years the ZMP supervised the Polish scouting movement. Membership in it was often obligatory (officially or unofficially) for various purposes, such as being able to attend university. Membership was refused to those who were deemed "unsuitable" - due to a non-worker or peasant family background, or their ties with the pro-West World War II-era Polish forces or resistance.

The ZMP's membership grew from almost 0.5 million in 1948, to over 1 million in 1951 and over 2 million in 1955.

The uniform of a ZMP member consisted of a green shirt and red tie.

== See also ==
- Bolesław Bierut
- Sztandar Młodych
