= Wilanów Cemetery =

Cemetery in Warsaw, Poland

Wilanow Cemetery
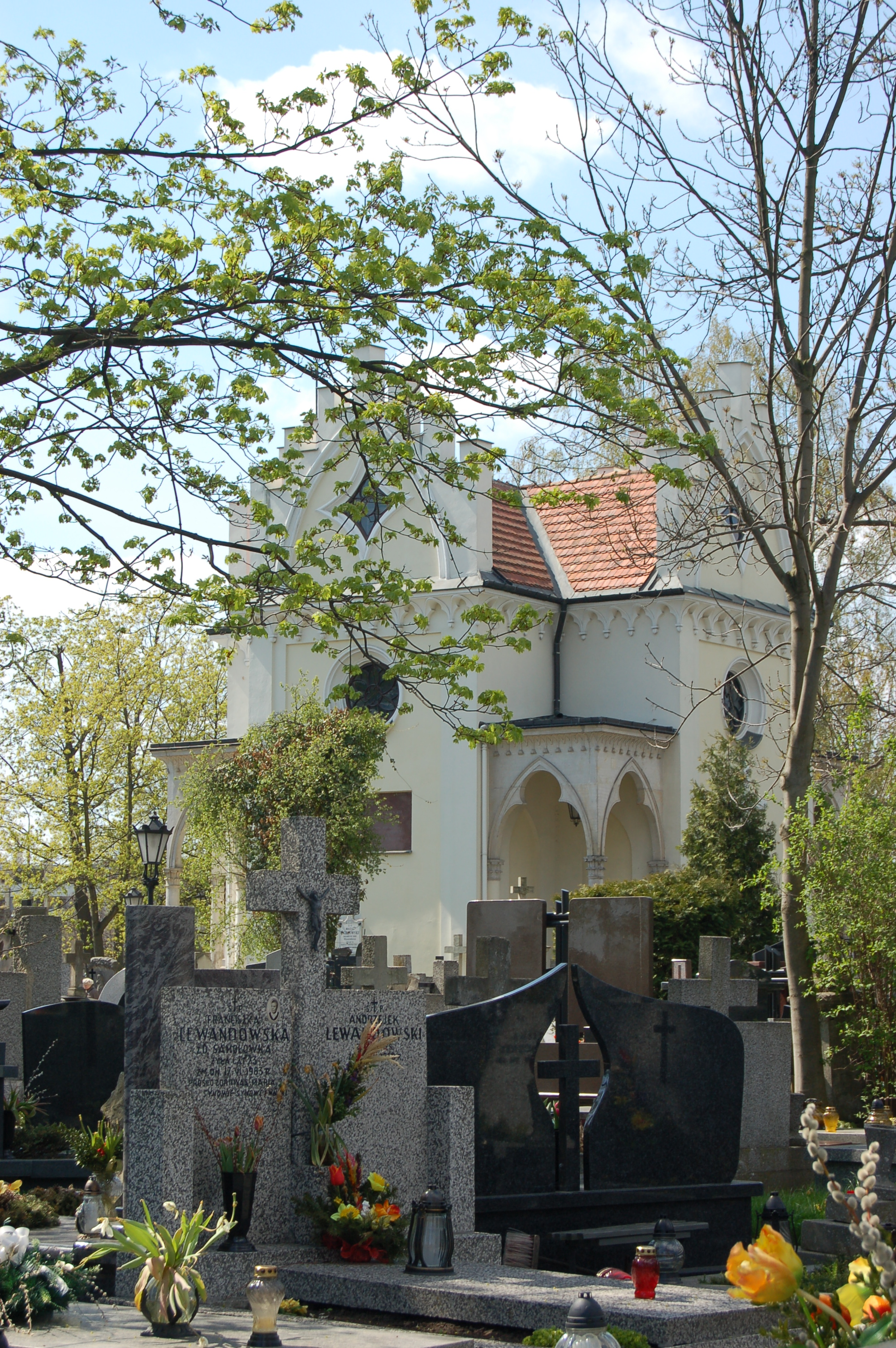
- Interactive map of Wilanow Cemetery

Details
- Established: 1816
- Country: Poland
- Coordinates: 52°10′04″N 21°04′57″E
- Type: Roman Catholic
- No. of graves: 100+

Wilanów Cemetery also known as Cmentarz w Wilanowie is a Roman Catholic cemetery in Warsaw's Wilanów district. It is located at the intersection of Wiertnicza and Wilanowska streets.

== History ==
The cemetery was founded on the initiative of Stanisław Kostka, Aleksander Stanisław Potocki and Aleksandra of Lubomirski Potocka in 1816. Initially, it was on the set of a circle with a neo-Gothic chapel-mausoleum in the middle, which was erected between 1823–1826 according to the design of Chrystian Piotr Aigner. There are graves of Stanisław Kostka and Ignacy Potocki in it.

The cemetery was repeatedly expanded. It was first expanded for the first time around 1860 when arms were added to the circular cemetery, giving it the shape of a Greek cross. Again, the cemetery area was enlarged between 1877–1888. It was last extended at the turn of the 20th and 21st centuries.

Around 1860 the cemetery was fenced with ceramic shapes according to the design of Henryk Marconi.

In 1947 Gerard Ciołek developed a plan for the regulation and enlargement of the cemetery, which grew chaotically during the war. The project was not implemented and the cemetery, with the passage of time increased, did not gain on the order.

The insurgents of 1863 were buried in the cemetery, soldiers died in September 1939 and Warsaw insurgents from 1944. Among the mass graves from the World War II period are: 10 graves covering the bodies of 73 soldiers of the 360 Infantry Regiment, 32 graves covering 171 insurgents of Warsaw Baszta regiments (Oaza battalion) and Waligóra (Grochów platoon and the Jeleń squadron) and graves of several civilian executions carried out by Germans in Wilanów.

== Buried in the cemetery ==
- Przemysław Gintrowski (1951–2012) – composer and musician
- Ludmiła Marjańska (1923–2005) – poet, prose writer and translator of English literature
- Bolesław Płotnicki (1913–1988) – actor
- Ignacy Potocki (1750–1809) – politician, writer, patriotic activist
- Stanisław Kostka Potocki (1755–1821) – politician, educational activist
- Anna Radziwiłł (1939–2009) – teacher, historian, senator, former deputy minister of education
- Janusz Franciszek Radziwiłł (1880–1967) – a Polish conservative politician, in the years 1935–39 a senator of the Second Polish Republic and XIII Ordinate in Olyyka
- Krzysztof Mikołaj Radziwiłł (1898–1986) – Polish aristocrat, prince, landowner, political activist, senator of the Republic of Poland, deputy to Legislative Sejm
- Ireneusz Sekuła (1943–2000) – politician, deputy prime minister (1988–89)
- Jerzy Szmajdziński (1952–2010) – politician, minister of defense (2001–05), deputy marshal of the Sejm (2007–10)
- Halina Wasilewska-Trenkner (1942–2017) – Minister of Finance in Cabinet of Jerzy Buzek (2001), member of Monetary Policy Council (2004–10), adjunct professor at Statistics and Demography Department in Warsaw School of Economics, lecturer in Kozminski University
- Jan Wejchert (1950–2009) – entrepreneur, founder of the ITI Group
- Roman Wilhelmi (1936–1991) – actor
