= Mirosław Pietrewicz =

Polish economist and politician (1941–2022)

Deputy Prime Minister of the Republic of Poland
- In office 7 February 1996 – 31 October 1997
- Preceded by: Roman Jagieliński
- Succeeded by: Marek Belka

Minister of State Treasury
- In office 1 October 1996 – 31 October 1997
- Preceded by: Wiesław Kaczmarek
- Succeeded by: Emil Wąsacz

Member of the Sejm
- In office 1997–2001

Member of the Monetary Policy Council
- In office 2004–2010

Personal details
- Born: 2 January 1941 Podlaskie Voivodeship, General Government
- Died: 6 May 2022 (aged 81) Warsaw, Poland
- Party: PSL
- Education: SGH Warsaw School of Economics
- Occupation: Economist

Mirosław Pietrewicz (2 January 1941 – 6 May 2022) was a Polish politician. A member of the Polish People's Party, he served as Deputy Prime Minister and Minister of State Treasury from 1996 to 1997. He also served in the Sejm from 1997 to 2001. He died in Warsaw on 6 May 2022 at the age of 81.
