= Ministry of Economic Cooperation with Abroad (Poland) =

Former government ministry of Poland

Ministry of Economic Cooperation with Foreign Countries (Polish: Ministerstwo Współpracy Gospodarczej z Zagranicą) was a Polish government administration office, its tasks included implementation of state policy and coordination of activities in the field of economic, trade and scientific and technical relations with foreign countries.

The Ministry was established by the Act on the Establishment of the Office of the Minister of Foreign Economic Cooperation of 23 October 1987. The tasks and competences of the liquidated ministry were incorporated into the Ministry of Economy and the Ministry of State Treasury.

== List of ministers ==
Image	Name	Party	Term of Office		Prime minister (cabinet)
	Władysław Gwiazda	Polish United Workers' Party	24 October 1987	14 October 1988	Zbigniew Messner (Messner)
	Dominik Jastrzębski	Polish United Workers' Party	14 October 1988	12 November 1989	Mieczysław Rakowski (Rakowski)
	Marcin Święcicki	Polish United Workers' Party	12 November 1989	12 January 1991	Tadeusz Mazowiecki (Mazowiecki)
	Dariusz Ledworowski	nonpartisan	12 January 1991	23 December 1991	Jan Krzysztof Bielecki (Bielecki)
	Adam Glapiński	Centre Agreement	23 December 1991	11 July 1992	Jan Olszewski (Olszewski)
	Andrzej Arendarski	Liberal Democratic Congress	11 July 1992	26 October 1993	Hanna Suchocka (Suchocka)
	Lesław Podkański	Polish People's Party	26 October 1993	6 March 1995	Waldemar Pawlak (Pawlak I)
	Jacek Buchacz	Polish People's Party	7 March 1995	4 September 1996	Józef Oleksy (Oleksy) Włodzimierz Cimoszewicz (Cimoszewicz)
