= Adam Glapiński =

Polish economist and politician

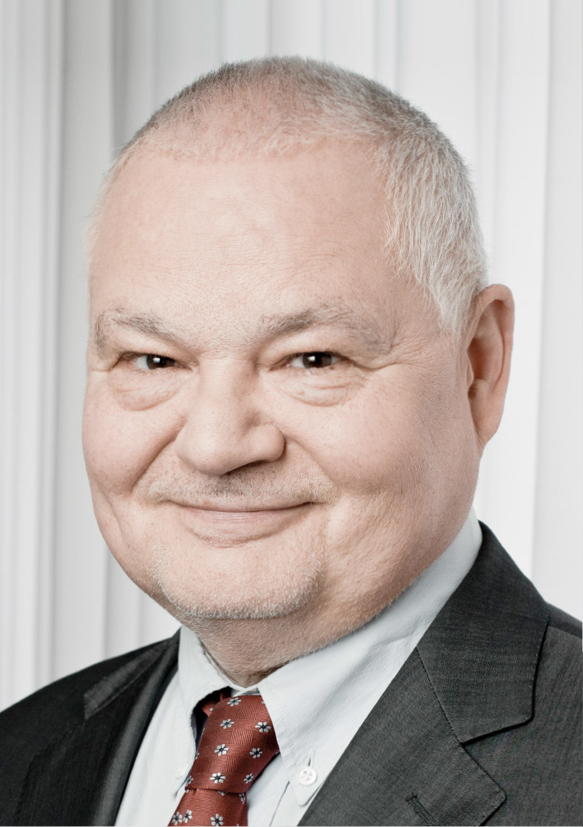

President of the National Bank of Poland
- Incumbent
- Assumed office 21 June 2016
- Appointed by: Andrzej Duda
- Preceded by: Marek Belka

Minister for Construction and Spatial Planning
- In office 12 January 1991 – 5 December 1991
- President: Lech Wałęsa
- Prime Minister: Jan Krzysztof Bielecki
- Preceded by: Aleksander Paszyński
- Succeeded by: Andrzej Diakonow

Minister for Foreign Economic Cooperation
- In office 23 December 1991 – 10 June 1992
- President: Lech Wałęsa
- Prime Minister: Jan Olszewski
- Preceded by: Dariusz Ledworowski
- Succeeded by: Andrzej Arendarski

Personal details
- Born: 9 April 1950 (age 76) Warsaw, People's Republic of Poland
- Profession: Economist

Adam Glapiński (born 9 April 1950 in Warsaw) is a Polish economist and politician, the current president of the National Bank of Poland, Economics professor, a member of the first term of the Sejm, a member of the fourth term of the Senate and between 2010 and 2016 a member of the Monetary Policy Council. He also served as the Minister for Construction and Spatial Planning and later as the Minister for Foreign Economic Cooperation.

== Early life and education ==
Glapiński graduated from the Stefan Batory Gymnasium and Lyceum (Warsaw, Poland) in 1968, and then from the Socio-Economic Department of the Warsaw School of Economics in 1972. In the same year he completed his internship in the Bank of France. He completed his doctorate and then later his habilitation in 2004 at the Warsaw School of Economics. In 2013 he was awarded the title of professor of economic studies.

== Career ==
Since 1974, Glapiński worked at his alma mater as a university teacher, and later became a professor, he was also the head of the Department of Political Economics and History of Economic Thought at the Warsaw School of Economics. He was also a lecturer at the Polish Academy of Sciences (1978–1983), the Inter-University Centre of Postgraduate Studies in Dubrovnik (1986–1989), University of Colorado at Boulder (1993–1998), United States Business and Industrial Council at the University of Missouri and at the University of Kansas (1996), Institut Superieur de Gestion (1994–2005) and the prof. Edward Lipinski Higher School of Economics and Law in Kielce (2004–2007). In 1988 he received a scholarship from the Société historique et littéraire polonaise in Paris.

In the 1980s Glapiński was a member of the underground Solidarity movement, during the martial law he was the co-chair of the underground Solidarity movement in the Warsaw School of Economics. In 1989 he was one of the founders of the Warsaw branch of the "Democratic Centre" Association. In 1990 he was a co-founder of the Centre Agreement and the Warsaw branch of the Liberal Democratic Congress. He was co-chair of the Centre Agreement during 1991–93. In 1991 he served as the Minister for Construction and Spatial Planning in the government of Jan Krzysztof Bielecki. He was elected to the first term of the Sejm from the list of the Center Civic Alliance and a Centre Agreement candidate. In the Cabinet of Jan Olszewski he served as the Minister for Foreign Economic Cooperation. In 1997 with the support of the Movement for Reconstruction of Poland he was elected as a member of the Senate for the Tarnów Voivodeship. He soon left the Movement for Reconstruction of Poland to join the Christian National Union and the Solidarity Electoral Action senate club. In the Senate he was the deputy chairman of the National Economic Committee. He was a member of the Joint Parliamentary Committee on the European Union and Poland. In 2001 he did not seek re-election.

He was later named as the chairman of the supervisory board by the Export Development Bank – MBank (in 1992), Centralwings (in 2007) and then KGHM Polish Copper (in 2007). Between 2007 and 2008 he was chairman of the board and General Director of Polkomtel.

Between 1993 and 2001 Glapiński directed the Institute of Economics and Political Freedom. He was a member of the committee for the "Poland Now" Award (between 2006–09 and 2009–12). He is currently a member of the International Joseph A. Schumpeter Society (since 2002) and the European Society for the History of Economic Thought (since 2007).

On 5 February 2009 Glapiński became one of the two (along with Ryszard Bugaj) economic advisors to President Lech Kaczynski (until 15 February 2010). On 16 February 2010 the president announced his decision to appoint him to the Monetary Policy Council for a six-year term.

On 29 February 2016 President Andrzej Duda, at the request of the then President of the NBP Marek Belka, appointed him as a member of the board of the National Bank of Poland. He held this position until 9 June 2016. In May 2016 Andrzej Duda nominated him for the position of President of the NBP. On 10 June 2016 the eighth term of the Sejm confirmed him as the new president of the National Bank of Poland. Adam Glapiński assumed office on 21 June 2016 after taking the oath of office.

After Glapiński was elected for a second term, there were serious constitutional doubts as to his position.

== Other activities ==
- European Bank for Reconstruction and Development (EBRD), ex-officio member of the board of governors (since 2016)
- European Systemic Risk Board (ESRB), ex-officio member of the general board (since 2016)
- World Bank, ex-officio member of the board of governors (since 2016)

== Personal life ==
Glapiński is married.

== Selected publications ==
- Transforming Economic Systems: the Case of Poland, Published by Physica-Verlag Heidelberg in Germany and Springer-Verlag in New York, 1991
- Post-Crisis Economic Policy. Innovation Based Growth, „Journal of Management and Financial Sciences”, Issue 5, 2011
- Animal Spirits in Economics, „Journal of Management and Financial Sciences”, Issue 11, 2013

== Bibliography ==
- Page of the Member of the First Term of the Sejm. (in Polish)
- Adam Glapiński in the "People of Science" database of the Polish Science portal. (in Polish)

Political offices
Preceded by Aleksander Paszyński	Minister for Construction and Spatial Planning; 1991	Succeeded by Andrzej Diakonow
Preceded by Dariusz Ledworowski	Minister for Foreign Economic Cooperation; 1991–1992	Succeeded by Andrzej Arendarski
Government offices
Preceded by Marek Belka	President of the National Bank of Poland; 2016–present	Incumbent
