= Andrzej Sławiński =

Polish economist

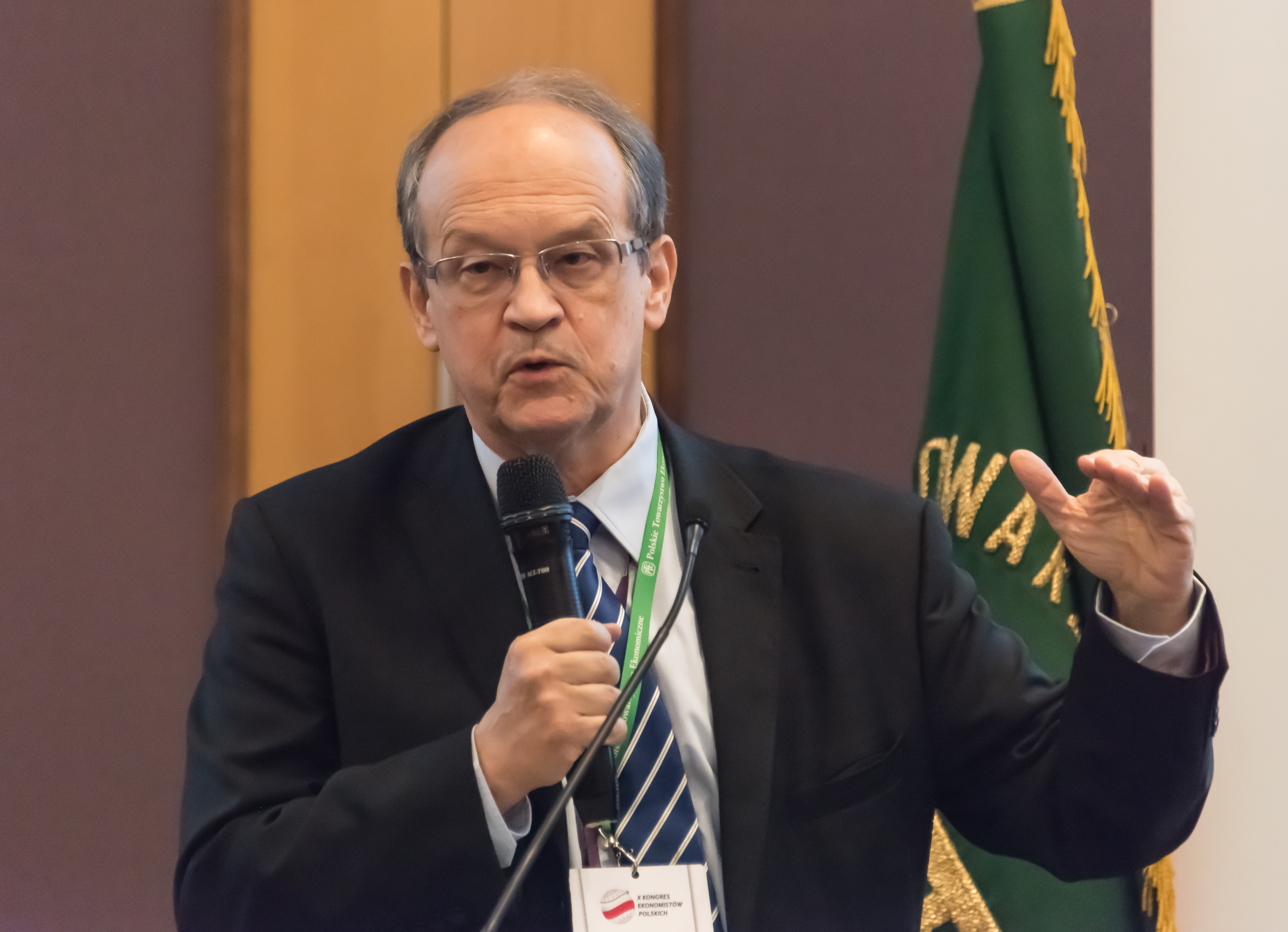
- Prof. Andrzej Sławiński during the 10th Congress of Polish Economists at the Sheraton Hotel in Warsaw, 2019
- Born: July 31, 1951 (age 75); Warsaw, Poland

Academic background
- Education: SGH Warsaw School of Economics

Andrzej Sławiński (born July 31, 1951 in Warsaw) is a Polish economist and Professor of Economics at the Warsaw School of Economics. He is a member of the Council of Monetary Policies since 2004 and a fellow of Collegium Invisibile.

He received his M.A. in economics in 1973 and Ph.D. in international finance in 1979 both from the Warsaw School of Economics.

His research work concentrates on central banks functioning, financial crises in developing economies and financial (especially derivatives) markets. Author of numerous publications. In September 2010, he was appointed to the Economic Institute of the National Bank of Poland.
