= Marek Rocki =

Polish politician

Marek Rocki Dr. Hab.
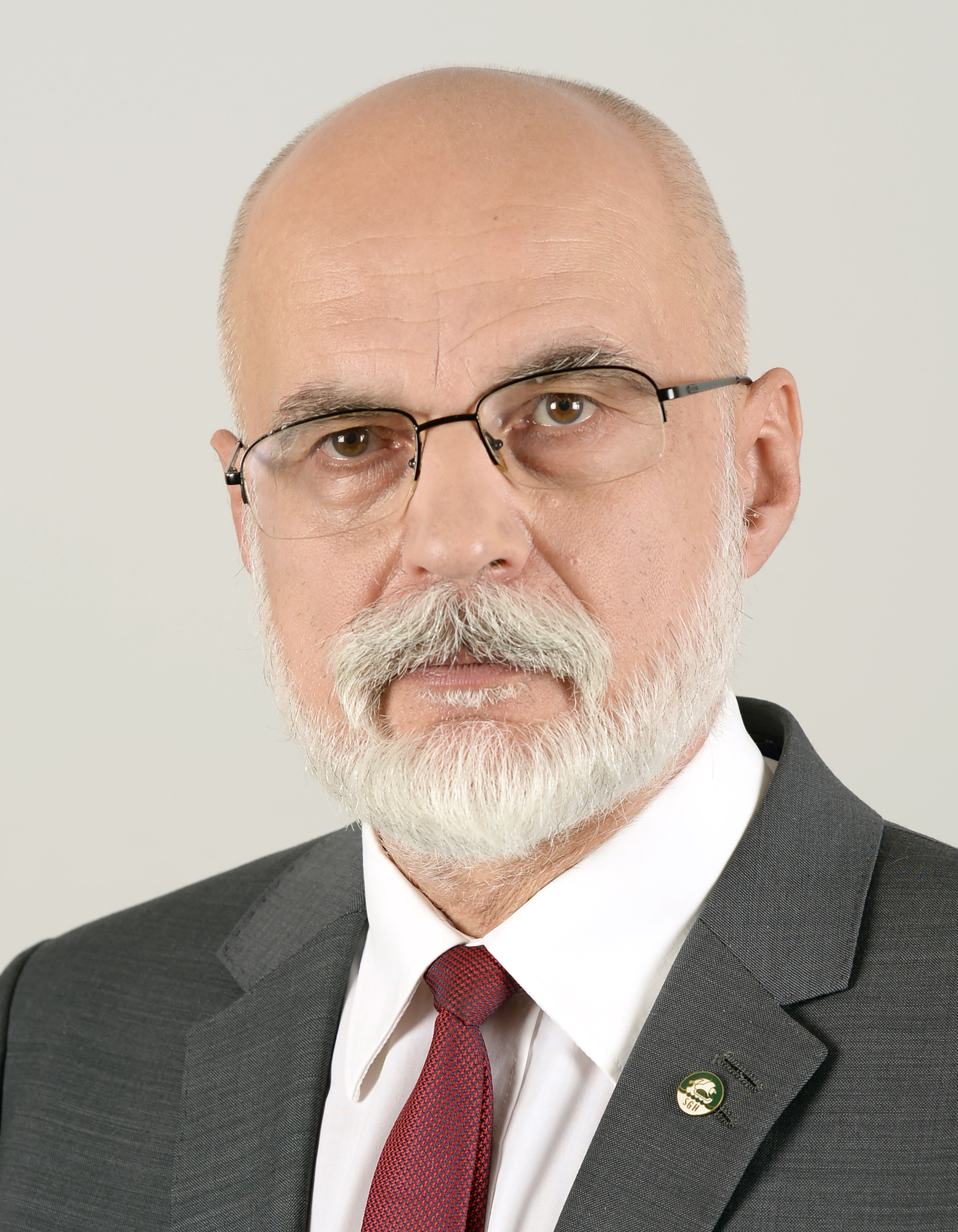

Member of Senate
- In office 20 October 2005 – 11 November 2019
- Succeeded by: Barbara Borys-Damięcka
- Constituency: 18-Warsaw (2005-2011), 43-Warsaw (2011-2019)

Personal details
- Born: 14 May 1953 (age 73) Warsaw, Poland
- Party: Civic Platform
- Spouse: Elżbieta Rocka
- Children: 1
- Education: SGH Warsaw School of Economics

Professor Marek Dariusz Rocki (born 14 May 1953) is a Polish econometrician. He served as a Rector of Warsaw School of Economics (SGH) (1999–2002, 2002–2005 and 2016–2020) and a Polish Senator from Civic Platform (2005–2019).

== Academic career ==
Born in Warsaw, he graduated from the Warsaw School of Economics (SGH) in 1977 with a master's degree, and was awarded a doctorate in econometrics in 1981, when he became a full-time member of the school's faculty. In 1988 Rocki has attained habilitation in economics. He served as Vice-Rector of SGH from 1990 to 1996, and as Dean of the Diploma Studium (the unit responsible for master's level studies) from 1996 to 1999. He was elected Rector of the SGH for two consecutive terms - the maximum allowed - in total from 1999 to 2005. After that, he was elected the Dean of Collegium of Economic Analysis, a unit of the SGH grouping scientists specializing in quantitative methods. He is a Professor of the SGH, as opposed to professor as an independent (state-awarded) academic distinction.

In the 1980s and 1990s he was also a lecturer at the Warsaw's Collegium Civitas and the Białystok branch of the Warsaw University.

== Other activities ==
Rocki is an author of Polish liceum and academic institutions' rankings, published by the Rzeczpospolita daily and Perspektywy monthly. He has been serving as a member of many education-related, non-profit and sports-related bodies, including the Polish Olympic Committee, as well as chairs the Academic Sports Association of Poland (AZS). In June 2005 he became the chairman of the Council of Public Service of the Republic of Poland. On 26 April 2006 Prime Minister Kazimierz Marcinkiewicz recalled him from this post, but he remained a member of the council.

== Politics ==
Rocki is a member of Civic Platform party and a member of the conservative liberal KoLiber society. In the 2005 parliamentary elections, he was elected to the Senate of Poland, representing the constituency of Warsaw, from the Civic Platform list. He was a member of Platforma's Senator's Club. He has also sat in the Committees for Science, Education and Sports and Foreign Affairs. In 2012 his last minute adjustment to the Polish freedom of information law (Pol. "poprawka Rockiego") caused significant controversy as it was pushed against all legislative best practices and procedures, and was eventually ruled unconstitutional by the Constitutional Court.

== Personal ==
He is married to Elżbieta, and has a daughter, Katarzyna Rocka (born 1981), who is also an SGH graduate.

== Honours and awards ==
Rocki is a recipient of many awards, including the Knight's Cross of Polonia Restituta (2003), Badge of Merit for the City of Warsaw (2001), Medal of Honor for his contribution to statistics RP (2003), Medal of Merit ZKRPiBWP (2003), Medal Pro Memoria (2005) and the Medal of Merit for National Defence (2006).
