= Włodzimierz Sroka =

Polish economist and corporate executive (1967–2023)

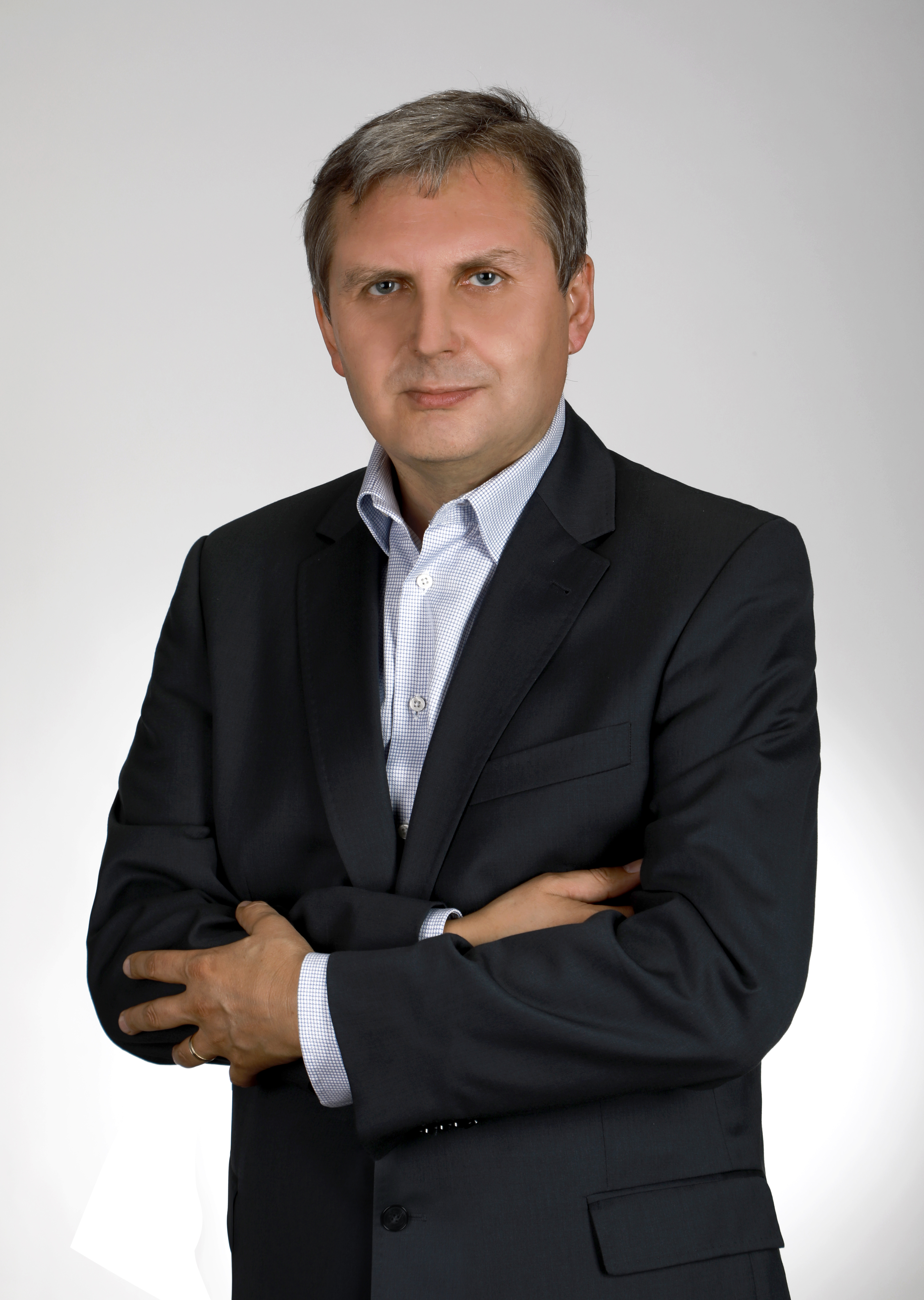
- Born: 15 August 1967; Bolesław, Poland
- Died: 21 January 2023 (aged 55)
- Citizenship: Polish
- Education: University of Economics in Katowice (MEc, PhD)
- Scientific career
- Fields: Strategic management
- Workplaces: WSB University

Włodzimierz Krzysztof Sroka (15 August 1967 – 21 January 2023) was a Polish economist and manager, associate professor of strategic management at the WSB University in Dąbrowa Górnicza.

== Life and career ==
A graduate of the University of Economics in Katowice, he earned his PhD in economics in 1999 at the Faculty of Management of the same university, based on the thesis entitled Strategic alliances as a form of cooperation in a global environment. In 2012 he received his habilitation degree in the same discipline at the University of Žilina on the basis of the thesis entitled Management as the key success factor of alliance networks.

From 1999 he was associated with the University of Dąbrowa Gornicza (WSB University), from 1999 to 2012 as an assistant professor and subsequently as an associate professor at the Department of Management. Between 2013 and 2014, he held the position of Vice Rector for Science. The primary area of his scientific interest was strategic management, with particular emphasis on inter-organizational cooperation, CSR and business ethics.

Sroka also held various managerial positions at several companies from 1996. He was a specialist, chief specialist, head of department, director and then a member of the Board and deputy general manager for restructuring and development at Huta Katowice SA (1992-2002); Vice President of the Board of HK Stal Service (2003-2006); Vice President of the Board and managing director of KEM Profil (2006-2007); and Vice President and then President of the Board at RAPZ (since 2008). He has also served as a member of the Supervisory Boards at several companies, including, among others, Huta Bankowa (Vice Chairman, 1999–2002); HK GKI (chairman, 2002–2003); Sentel (chairman, 2003–2005); and WRA (Vice Chairman, 2008).

Sroka was the senior editor of the “European Journal of International Management”; Editor-in-Chief of the journal "Forum Scientiae Oeconomia"; and a member of the editorial board of "Organizacija" He is also a member of the Scientific Councils of the following journals: "Engineering Management in Production and Services"; "Marketing of Research and Scientific Institutions"; and "Zeszyty Naukowe Wyższej Szkoły Humanitas. Zarządzanie".

Sroka died on 21 January 2023, at the age of 55.

== Selected publications ==
- W. Sroka, Sieci aliansów. Poszukiwanie przewagi konkurencyjnej poprzez współpracę, PWE, Warszawa 2012, ISBN 978-83-208-1980-9.
- W. Sroka, Š. Hittmár, Management of Alliance Networks: Formation, Functionality And Post-Operational Strategies, Springer Verlag, 2013, ISBN 978-3-642-34245-5
- J. Cygler, W.Sroka, Structural Pathologies In Inter-Organizational Networks And Their Consequences, „Procedia - Social and Behavioral Sciences”, 110: 52–63, 2014.
- W. Sroka W., J.Cygler, B.Gajdzik, The Transfer of Knowledge in Intra-Organizational Networks: A Case Study Analysis, „Organizacija”, 47(1), 24–34, 2014.
- W. Sroka, Š. Hittmár (red.): Management of Network Organizations. Springer, 2015, ISBN 978-3-319-17346-7.
- J. Cygler, W. Sroka, The Boundaries of Coopetition: A Case Study of Polish Companies Operating in the High-Tech Sector [w:] J. Ateljević, J. Trivić, Economic Development and Entrepreneurship in Transition Economies Springer Verlag, 2016, s. 253–269. ISBN 978-3-319-28855-0.
- W. Sroka, Š.Hittmár, J.Kurowska-Pysz (red.), New Trends in Management and Production Engineering – Regional, Cross-Border and Global Perspectives, Shaker Verlag, 2016
- W. Sroka W., J. Vveinhardt, Nepotism and favoritism in the steel sector: are these phenomena prevalent? Proceedings of the 5th International Scientific Conference “Innovation Management, Entrepreneurship and Sustainability” (IMES 2017), 25–26 May 2017, Prague

== Awards ==
- Komisja Edukacji Narodowej Medal (2013).
