= Maciej Kranz =

Polish-American business executive and author

- Born: Warsaw, Poland
- Citizenship: Poland; United States of America
- Education: SGH Warsaw School of Economics; Texas Christian University
- Website: www.maciejkranz.com

Maciej Kranz (born 22 November 1964; Warsaw, Poland) is a Polish-American executive, New York Times bestselling author, angel investor, faculty member of Singularity University, and an expert in Internet of Things (IoT) technologies such as Artificial Intelligence, blockchain, and edge computing. He currently serves as General Manager, Enterprise at Pure Storage and is a frequent speaker on technology trends in the enterprise.

== Early life ==
Maciej Kranz was born on 22 November 1964 in Warsaw, Poland to Jan and Malgorzata Kranz. He studied at the SGH Warsaw School of Economics, during which he served as National Committee Exchange Controller for AIESEC in Poland. Kranz later obtained his MBA at Texas Christian University.

== Career ==
Prior to joining Pure Storage, Kranz served as EVP and CTO at KONE. He previously served as Vice President and General Manager in the Corporate Strategic Innovation Group at Cisco Systems. During his 20 years in Cisco Systems, he has held several leadership roles in the fields of enterprise networking and the Internet of Things.

Kranz joined Cisco in 1999, where he led marketing for Cisco's stackable Ethernet switching business unit. He became Vice President of Marketing for the Wireless Networking Business Unit in 2006, during which time he drove the development of Cisco Motion, a mobility vision architecture.

Kranz led the Borderless Networks effort in 2009 and in 2012 became a General Manager of the Connected Industries Group where he drove Cisco's IoT internet of things (IoT) efforts.

Before his stint at Cisco Systems, Kranz served as the Vice President of Marketing for IP Highway, Inc. and worked in product management at both 3Com, where he led the expansion and development of its Ethernet network interface cards into a $1 billion product line, and IBM.

== Books ==
Kranz's book, Building the Internet of Things is on the New York Times' and USA Today's bestseller lists and was listed as one of the 10 business books every entrepreneur should read in 2017 by Fortune Magazine. The book was also selected as one of the 10 books for innovators and entrepreneurs to read by Economía y Negocios. It has been translated into 10 languages. In 2018, Kranz published Building the Internet of Things - a Project Workbook, a companion to his first book providing interactive steps in planning, implementing, and evaluating IoT projects.

== Public Platforms ==
In addition to keynoting at industry conferences, Kranz frequently conducts media interviews worldwide, and regularly writes commentary as member of the Forbes Technology Council and the IDG Contributor Network, as well as for many other publications.
