= Wiesława Ziółkowska =

Polish economist and politician (1950–2026)

- Born: 21 May 1950; Poznań, Poland
- Died: 23 July 2026 (aged 76)
- Education: Poznań Economics Academy
- Occupations: Politician, economist
- Political party: Polish United Workers' Party; Labour Union

Wiesława Ziółkowska (21 May 1950 – 23 July 2026) was a Polish economist and politician.

== Life and career ==
Wiesława Ziółkowska was born in Poznań on 21 May 1950. In 1973 she graduated from the Faculty of Commerce and Economics at the Poznań Economics Academy. From 1974 to 1990 she was a member of the Polish United Workers' Party. In 1977 she obtained doctorate. She co-founded Labour Union. From 1989 to 1997 she was a member of Sejm. As an MP, she was head of the Sejm Committee on Economic Policy, Budget and Finance. In 1996 she obtained habilitation. From 1998 to 2004 she was a member of Monetary Policy Council. From 2009 to 2019 she was employed at the Poznań Higher School of Banking. There, she was head of the Department of Public Finance. She was a member of the Scientific Council of the Polish Economic Society. She supervised one doctoral dissertation.

Ziółkowska died on 23 July 2026, at the age of 76. She was buried in Spławie near Poznań.
