= Marcin Święcicki =

Polish politician and economist (born 1947)

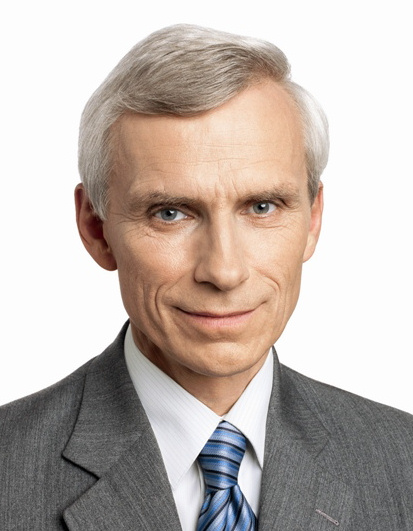

Minister for Foreign Economic Relations
- In office 1989–1991
- Prime Minister: Tadeusz Mazowiecki

City mayor of Warsaw
- In office 3 November 1994 – 30 March 1999

Personal details
- Born: 17 April 1947 (age 79) Warsaw
- Education: University of Warsaw; George Washington University
- Website: Święcicki Blog

Marcin Święcicki (born 17 April 1947) is a Polish politician and economist. He is a former Deputy Minister of Economy, Minister for Foreign Economic Relations, two-term Mayor of Warsaw, OSCE Economic Coordinator and Business Ombudsman of Ukraine.

As of 2026 he serves as a member of the Polish High-Level Advisory Group on Ukraine and an advisor on Ukraine's accession to the European Union to Foreign Minister Radosław Sikorski.

== Early life and education ==
Święcicki was born in Warsaw on 17 April 1947. He graduated from the University of Warsaw. He attended George Washington University and Harvard University for postgraduate studies and received a PhD from George Washington University in economics.

== Career ==
Święcicki was the secretary general of the Consultative Economic Council from 1982 to 1989. He served as deputy minister of economy and then minister for foreign economic relations from 1989 to 1991 in the cabinet led by Prime Minister Tadeusz Mazowiecki. In 1989, he was also elected to the Parliament and served for two terms, from 1989 to 1991 and from 1993 to 1996. He was the mayor of Warsaw between 1994 and 1999. Then he served as an advisor to the President of Lithuania Valdas Adamkus on economic reforms from 1999 to 2000. He was the director of economic and environmental affairs at the Organization for Security and Cooperation in Europe (OSCE) between February 2002 and 2005 In 2011, he was again elected to the Parliament.

He is the president of the support committee for the Museum of the History of Polish Jews and president of the Polish chapter of European Movement International.

=== Views and work ===
Although Święcicki was not a member of the Solidarity group, like other members of the Mazowiecki cabinet, he was acceptable to the group and had Solidarity-aligned economic views.

Święcicki is the author of several books which mostly focus on economics.
