= Joanna Cygler =

Polish economist

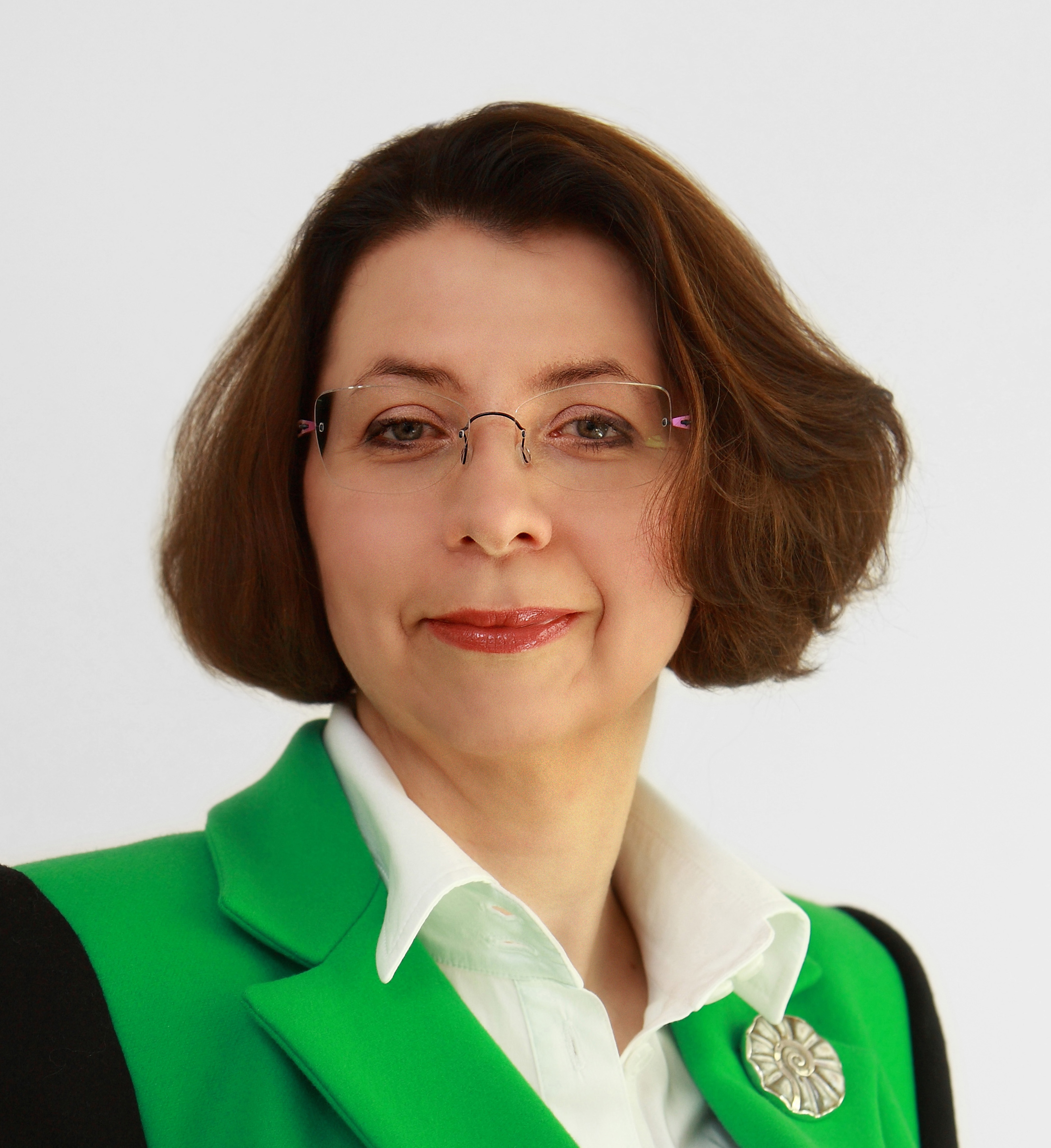
- Born: May 21, 1967 (age 59); Warsaw, Poland
- Citizenship: Polish
- Education: Warsaw School of Economics (MEc, PhD)
- Awards: Fulbright scholar (1995–1996)
- Scientific career
- Fields: Strategic management
- Workplaces: Warsaw School of Economics

Joanna Agnieszka Cygler (born May 21, 1967) is a Polish economist and professor of management at the Warsaw School of Economics.

== Career ==
Cygler was born in Warsaw and graduated from Warsaw School of Economics (WSE) in 1991. In 1999, she earned her Ph.D. in management (also WSE) in management for the thesis Zmiany zachodzące w pozycji i strategii rynkowej oraz systemie zarządzania przedsiębiorstw polskich pod wpływem aliansów strategicznych z partnerami zagranicznymi (The influence of strategic alliances with foreign partners on position, market strategy and management systems of Polish companies), for which she also received the Karol Adamiecki Award in 2000. In 2009, following her thesis Kooperencja przedsiębiorstw. Czynniki sektorowe i korporacyjne (Coopetition: sectoral and corporate factors), she received her habilitation. It was published under the same title and recognized in the 9th edition of the best habilitation competition organized by the Committee of Organization and Management Sciences, Polish Academy of Sciences (PAN). From 1995–1996, she studied as a Fulbright Scholar at the Carlson School of Management, University of Minnesota in Minneapolis, USA

From 1991–2016, Cygler served on the faculty in WSE’s Department of Management in successive roles of assistant, assistant professor, and professor. In 2016, she was appointed Head of the Management Systems Department within the WSE Human Capital Institute. Her courses were several times among the highest rated in the annual WSE students' Top Ten ranking. She also teaches Executive MBA courses at the PAN Institute of Economic Sciences.

Alongside her teaching and academic leadership, Cygler served as director of research at the Polish Information and Foreign Investment Agency from 2002-2003, followed by her work as an expert in the International Bureau at the Chancellery of the President of the Republic of Poland through 2005. She then served as commercial and economic counsellor at the Embassy of the Republic of Poland in Mexico. In 2016, she was appointed Director’s Proxy for Scientific Development at the Institute of Aviation in Warsaw.

Cygler is a member of the Programme Board of the "Innovative Economy Institute" Foundation (Polish: Fundacja Instytut Innowacyjna Gospodarka), Warsaw, and an expert in the Intellectual Development (Polish: Inteligentny Rozwój) Program at the Ministry of Development, and an expert at the Employers' Union of Warsaw and Masovia (Związek Pracodawców Warszawy i Mazowsza).

Cygler also serves on editorial boards of Engineering Management in Production and Services, Forum Scientiae Oeconomia, Zeszyty Naukowe Wyższej Szkoły Humanitas. Zarządzanie, and Marketing Instytucji Badawczych i Naukowych.

== Selected publications ==
- J. Cygler, W. Sroka, The Boundaries of Coopetition: A Case Study of Polish Companies Operating in the High-Tech Sector [in:] J. Ateljević, J. Trivić, Economic Development and Entrepreneurship in Transition Economies Springer, 2016, pp. 253–269. ISBN 978-3-319-28855-0.
- J. Cygler, Structural Pathology in Inter-organizational Networks and the Decision-Making Autonomy of Its Members [in:] W. Sroka, Š. Hittmár, Management of Network Organizations, Springer, 2015, pp. 181–195. ISBN 978-3-319-17346-7.
- J. Cygler (ed.), Wymiana gospodarcza Polski Wschodniej z krajami byłego ZSRR i ryzyka z tym związane, Warszawa, Związek Pracodawców Warszawy i Mazowsza, 2015, ISBN 978-83-64159-01-5.
- J. Cygler, M. Aluchna, E. Marciszewska, M.K. Witek-Hajduk, G. Materna, Kooperencja przedsiębiorstw w dobie globalizacji. Wyzwania strategiczne, uwarunkowania prawne, Warszawa, Wolters Kluwer Polska, 2013, ISBN 978-83-264-4360-2.
- J. Cygler, Guanxi – chińska koncepcja sieci, "Przegląd Organizacji". no 6, pp. 14–18, 2011.
- J. Cygler, Kooperencja przedsiębiorstw. Czynniki sektorowe i korporacyjne, Warszawa, Oficyna Wydawnicza Szkoły Głównej Handlowej, 2009, ISBN 978-83-7378-421-5.
- J. Cygler, Alianse strategiczne, Warszawa: Difin, 2002, ISBN 83-7251-223-X.
- J. Cygler, Organizacje sieciowe jako forma współdziałania przedsiębiorstw [in:] M. Romanowska, M. Trocki, Przedsiębiorstwo partnerskie, Warszawa: Difin, 2002, pp. 147–160. ISBN 83-7251-265-5

== Awards ==
- Silver Cross of Merit (2011).
