= Halina Wasilewska-Trenkner =

Polish economist

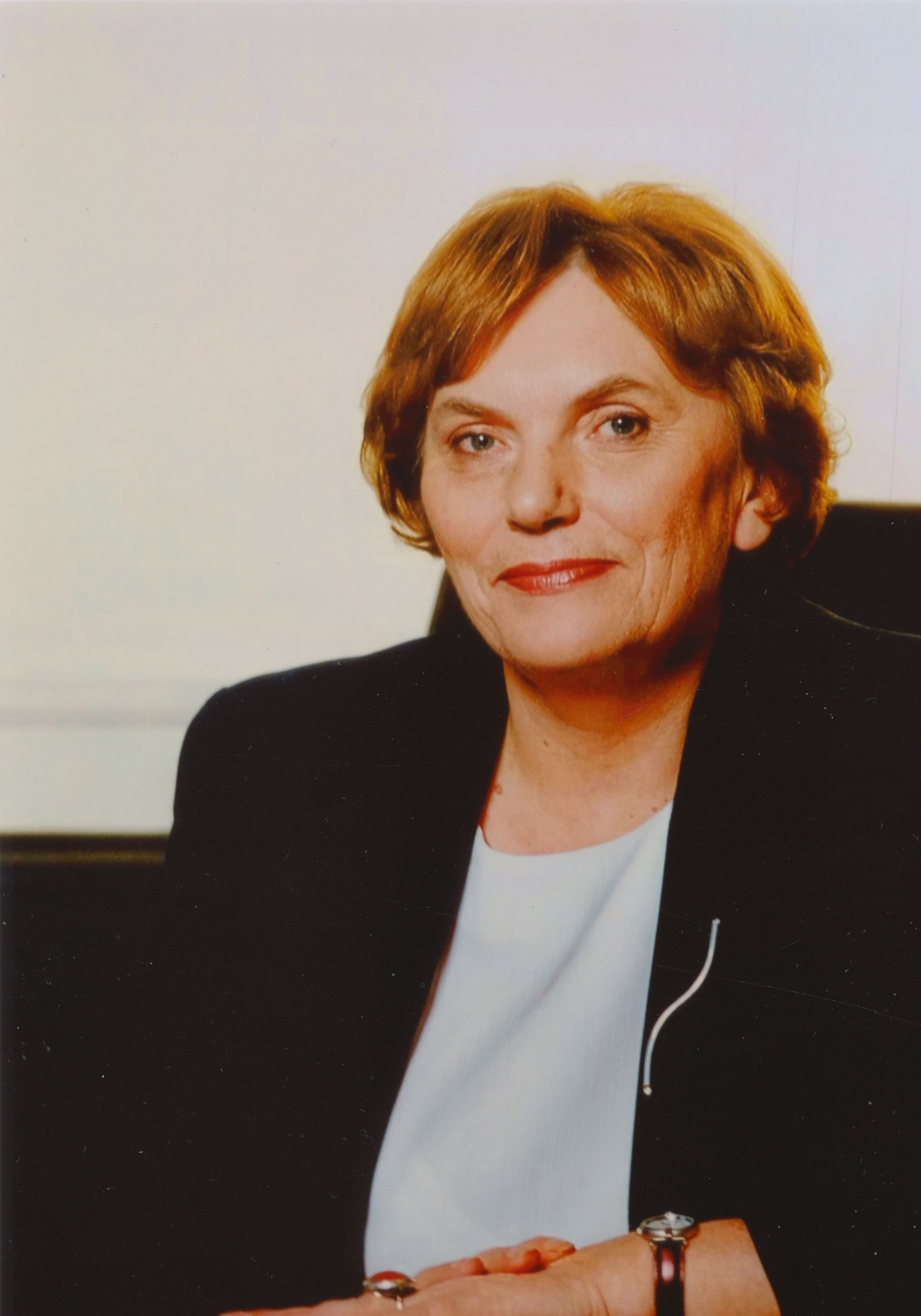

Minister of Finance
- In office 28 August 2001 – 19 October 2001
- Prime Minister: Jerzy Buzek
- Preceded by: Jarosław Bauc (Acting)
- Succeeded by: Marek Belka

Personal details
- Born: 26 April 1942 Warsaw, Occupied Poland
- Died: 15 November 2017 (aged 75) Grodzisk Mazowiecki, Poland
- Resting place: Catholic Wilanów Cemetery
- Party: Solidarity Electoral Action
- Spouse: Krzysztof Trenkner (1942–2014)
- Education: Warsaw School of Economics

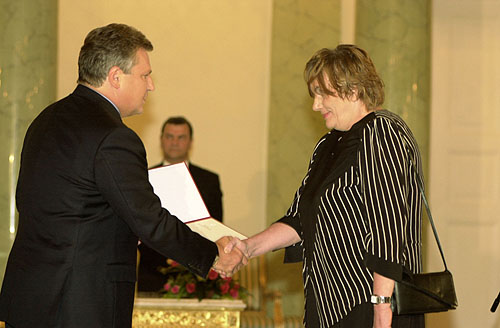
Halina Wasilewska-Trenkner receiving an appointment on the cabinet position of Finance Minister from President of Poland (28 August 2001)

Halina Weronika Wasilewska-Trenkner (26 April 1942 – 15 November 2017) was a Polish economist, academic and finance minister.

== Early life and education ==
Halina Weronika Wasilewska-Trenkner was born in Warsaw on 26 April 1942. The secondary school certificate she acquired in Warsaw in General education liceum dedicated to Polish novelist and poet Narcyza Żmichowska, and subsequently she became a student of Warsaw School of Economics. Then in 1964, she graduated with a degree in economics from Warsaw School of Economics (in the Department of International Trade). In December 1973, she received her PhD degree in economics from Warsaw School of Economics (subject of the dissertation: "Socio-Economic Aspects of Emigration from Poland in 1960–1970").

== Career ==
In 1964, she has been engaged as research assistant and then as adjunct professor at Statistics and Demography Department in Warsaw School of Economics. Next in 1974 she began working in the Secretariat of the Government Council (Commission) of Demography at Planning Commission in the Council of Ministers. In 1975–1990 she was a Scientific Secretary of Demographic Sciences Committee of Polish Academy of Sciences, and from 1995 – she became a member of Polish National Council of Statistics.

In 1986, Wasilewska-Trenkner has been appointed to a post of vice-manager in the Department of Employment and Incomes of Population at Planning Commission in the Council of Ministers. In 1987 she moved to a post of vice-manager in the Department of Control Systems and Methods of Planning. She continued working there until the dissolution of Planning Commission (as an organ of Council of Ministers). In 1989 she was invited to a post of manager of Department of Economic System in Office of Central Planning (CUP – Polish: Centralny Urząd Planowania). Her next appointment there was a manager of CUP Department of Economic Strategy (from the beginning of 1991). In October 1991 she has succeeded a post of Under Secretary of State in CUP.

In 1991–1992 she ran a presidency of 29th session of Senior Economic Advisers, who performed their duties at United Nations Economic Commission for Europe in Geneva, Switzerland. From 1996 she ran a presidency of the supervisory board of Bank Gospodarstwa Krajowego (Polish National Development Bank in Warsaw).

In 1995, Wasilewska-Trenkner was invited to Ministry of Finance. In 1995–2001 – a post of Under Secretary of State – managing the preparation and execution of Government budget she held there. Then – in 2001 – she became Minister of Finance, and finally – once again, in 2001–2002 – she held a post of Under Secretary of State. In August 2002 she became a secretary of state in Ministry of Finance responsible for Government budget. Simultaneously – a Government Plenipotentiary to Restructuring the public finance she has been appointed.

In 2004–2010 she was a member of Monetary Policy Council (2-nd tenure). In 2010, then president of National Bank of Poland Marek Belka invited her to perform the functions of his economic advisor.

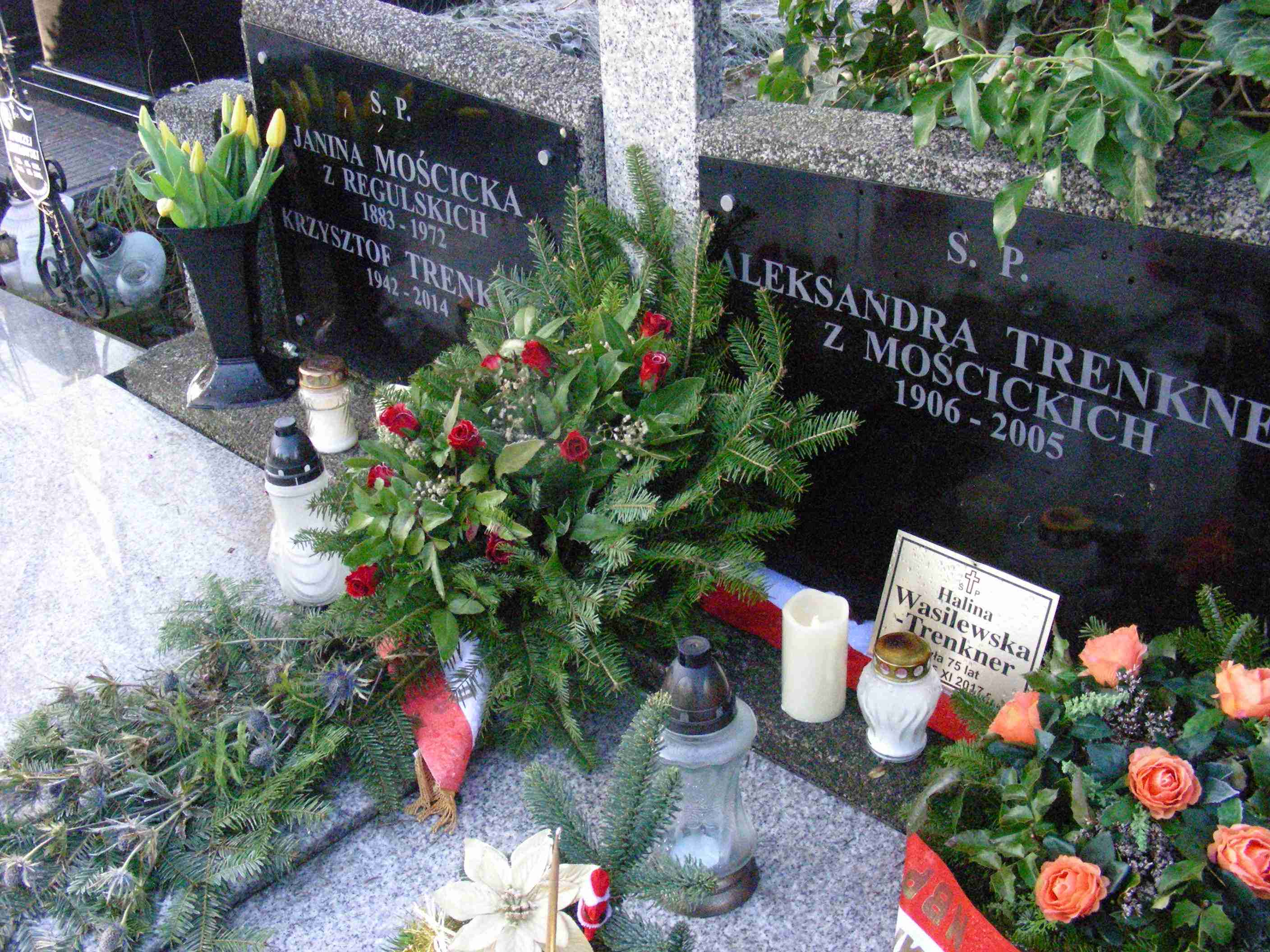
Halina Wasilewska-Trenkner tomb in Roman Catholic Wilanów Cemetery, 30 December 2017

In 2004, Wasilewska-Trenkner was decorated with Commander (order) of Polonia Restituta. Her death took place on 15 November 2017 in Grodzisk Mazowiecki hospital, and she was buried 22 November, in the Roman Catholic Wilanów Cemetery. She recently lived in Owczarnia near Podkowa Leśna. She had two children: daughter and son.

Her contribution in the range of demography, population policy and macroeconomic questions, particularly concerning dependences between demographic and economic problems is available in a number of books, papers and studies published in periodicals.

== Selected works ==
- (in Polish) Społeczno-ekonomiczne problemy migracji zewnętrznych w Polsce – Cz. 1 pracy: "Emigracja ludności z Polski w latach 1960–1970" (Socio-economic Problems of External Migrations in Poland – part 1 of: "External Migration of Population from Poland in 1960–1970" – PhD dissertation) Warsaw 1974, ed.: Szkoła Główna Planowania i Statystyki;
- (in Polish) Odstępy pomiędzy kolejnymi urodzeniami (Intervals Between Succeeding Births), [in:] Kazimierz Romaniuk (ed.): Wpływ czynników społeczno-gospodarczych na reprodukcję ludności w Polsce (Influence of Socio-Economic Factors on Reproduction of Population in Poland), Warsaw 1974, ed.Institute of Philosophy and Sociology of the Polish Academy of Sciences of PAN;
- (in Polish) Aktualne tendencje w polityce ludnościowej w Europie Zachodniej (Current Course in Population Policy in Western Europe), "Studia Demograficzne" ("Demographic Studies"), 1977, nr 47, p. 74;
- In memoriam Stanisław Borowski 1921–1976, "European Demographic Information Bulletin", vol. 8 (1977) nr 3 (9), pp. 94–95;
- (in Polish) Przewodnik metodyczny do skryptu "Wybrane zagadnienia ze statystyki" (A Methodical Guide to Lectures: "Selected Questions of Statistics"), Warsaw, 1976 ed.: SK, Zarząd Główny, Centralny Ośrodek Szkolenia Zaocznego;
- (in Polish) Analiza finansowa i elementy rachunku ekonomicznego w przedsiębiorstwach, Cz. 1 – Metody statystyczne w analizie: wybrane miary (Financial Analysis and Fundamentals of Economic Accounting in Business Enterprises, Part 1 – Statistical Methods of Analysis: Selected Indexes), Warsaw, 1980, ed.: SK. Zarząd Główny. Centralny Ośrodek Szkolenia Zaocznego;
- Recent Course of Fertility in European Countries with Centrally Planned Economies, British Society for Population Studies, 1981 (together with Jerzy Holzer);
- (in Polish) Wybrane zagadnienia statystyki na przykładach z zakresu zagadnień ekonomicznych (Selected Problems of Statistics – Examples of Economic Questions), Warsaw 1982, ed.: SKP Zarząd Główny – Centralny Ośrodek Szkolenia Zaocznego;
- Demographic Process in Poland 1970–1984, Government Population Commission, Committee of Demographic Sciences of Polish Academy of Sciences, Warsaw, 1984;
- (in Polish) Studia nad dzietnością i reprodukcją ludności w Polsce (Studies in Fertility and Reproduction of Population in Poland – joint-author), Warsaw 1985, ed.: ISiD – Institute of Statistics and Demography of Szkoła Główna Planowania i Statystyki;
- Prognoza rozwoju demograficznego Polski do roku 2020 [w:] "Społeczeństwo polskie na przełomie XX i XXI wieku", cz. I (Population Projection of Poland by 2020, [in]: "Polish Society on the Turn of XX and XXI Century" – part I, "World Population Prospects"), 1986, ed. Ossolineum Publ.;
- (in Polish) Polska lat osiemdziesiątych – Obraz demograficzny (Poland of 1980-ties – Demographic Image), Warsaw 1986 (together with: S. Klonowicz, K. Dzienio, E. Kowalczyk);
- (in Polish:) Makroekonomiczne uwarunkowania konkurencyjności przedsiębiorstw (Macroeconomic Conditions of Competitiveness of Enterprises), Instytut Rozwoju i Studiów Strategicznych (Institute for Development and Strategic Studies), 1995, "Raporty" ("Reports"), nr 34, pp. 7–17;
- (in Polish) Ubezpieczenia na rzecz gospodarki globalnej, sektorów i regionów (Insurance in Global Economy, Sectors and Regions – joint-author and scient. editor: Irena Jędrzejczyk), Bydgoszcz 2015, ed.: Oficyna Wydawnicza Edward Mitek;
- (in Polish) Kilka uwag o sytuacji gospodarczej [w:] "Polski rynek ubezpieczeń na tle kryzysów społeczno-gospodarczych" (A Few Remarks on the Economic Situation [in]: "Polish Insurance Market in the Context of Socio-economic Crisises"), Warsaw 2016 ed. Faculty of Management, University of Warsaw Press.

Wasilewska-Trenkner was also an author of numerous publications in scientific periodicals, e.g. "Studia Demograficzne" ("Demographic Studies"), "Gospodarka Narodowa" ("National Economy"), "Zeszyty Naukowe WSB w Poznaniu" – "Scientific Issues of European University of Business in Poznań".

== Bibliography ==
- (in Polish): http://www.mf.gov.pl/ministerstwo-finansow/minister/ministrowie-finansow (acc. 2018-01-29)
- (in German): https://www.welt.de/print-welt/article471389/Buzek-Stabilitaet-der-Staatsfinanzen-ist-nicht-in-Gefahr.html (Acc.: 2018-01-29)
- (in Polish) http://www.nbp.pl/home.aspx?f=/polityka_pieniezna/rada/2_kadencja/wasilewska-trenkner.html (Acc: 2017-11-16)
- (in Polish) http://www.mf.gov.pl/fr/ministerstwo-finansow/wiadomosci/aktualnosci/-/asset_publisher/M1vU/content/id/6188621 (Acc.: 2017-11-25)
- (in Polish) http://www.rp.pl/Dane-gospodarcze/311169882-Zmarla-Halina-Wasilewska-Trenkner-wieloletnia-autorka-budzetow-panstwa.html (Acc.: 2017-11-25)
- (in Polish) https://businessinsider.com.pl/wiadomosci/byla-minister-finansow-halina-wasilewska-trenkner-nie-zyje/j1st7ee (Acc: 2017-11-25)
- (in Polish) Ludzie nauki – http://nauka-polska.pl/#/profile/scientist?id=64787&_k=9j0cb4 (Acc.: 2017-11-16)

== See also ==
Cabinet of Jerzy Buzek
