= Monetary Policy Council =

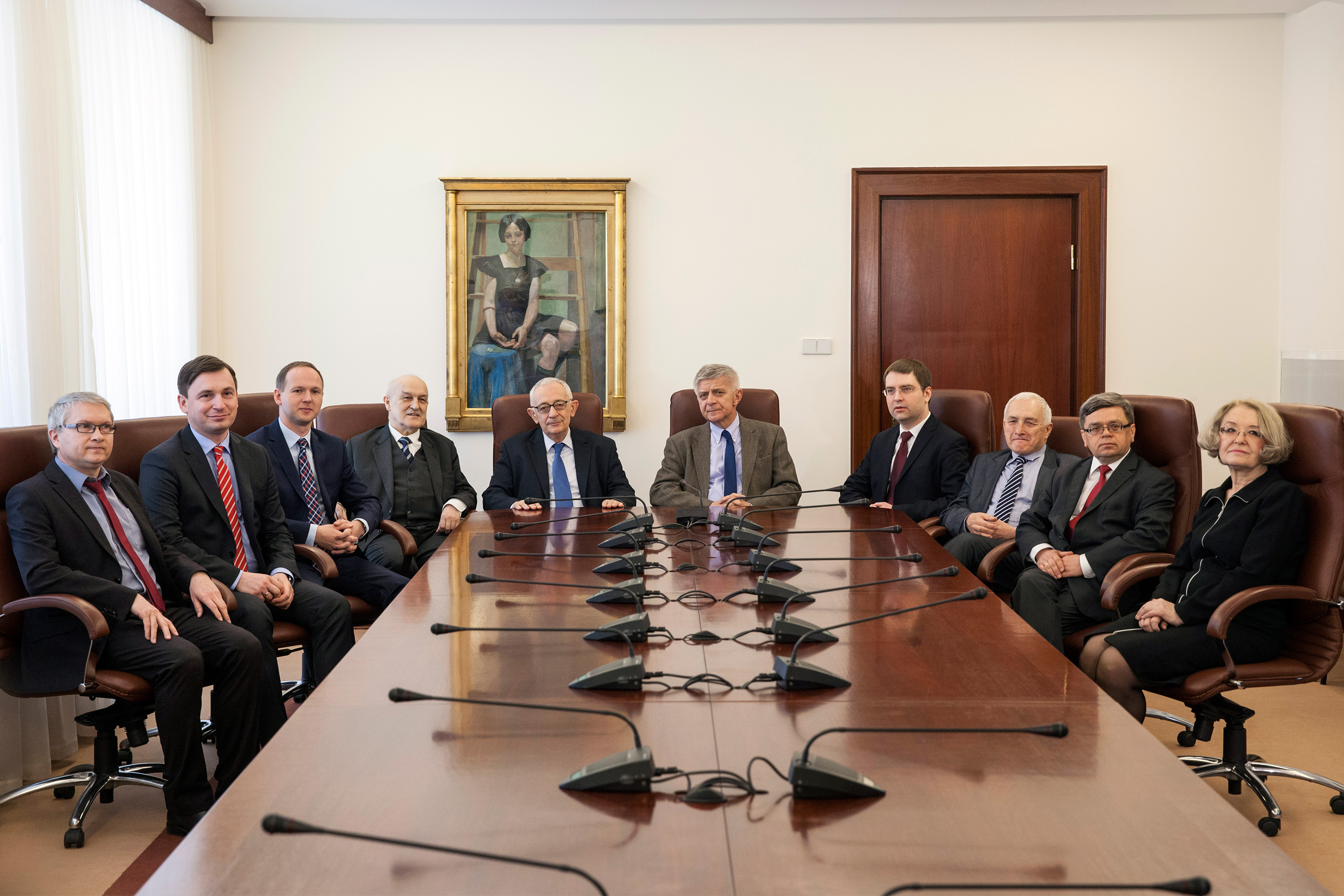
Members of the MPC, 2016

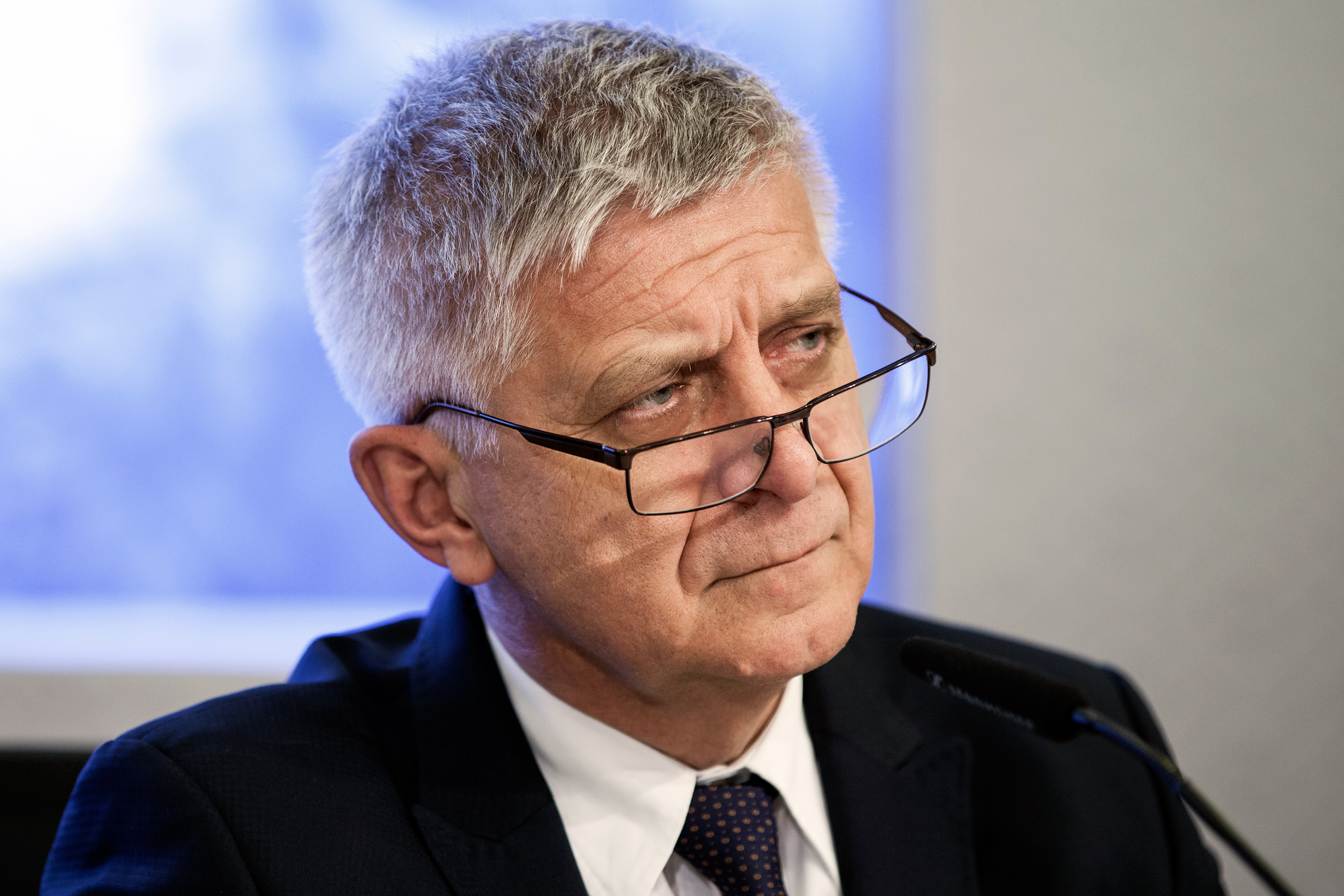
Prof. Marek Belka, previous Chairman of the MPC

The Monetary Policy Council, Polish: Rada Polityki Pieniężnej (RPP), is a body of Narodowy Bank Polski, the central bank of Poland.

Each year, in parallel with the budget project presented by the government, the MPC sets the bases of monetary policy. It sets the level of the NBP's interest rates, the rules and levels of bank's reserve obligations, sets an upper limit on obligations resulting from loans taken by the NBP in foreign banking and financial institutions.

The MPC is made up of: Council Leader, who is the President of the NBP, and nine other members, selected in equal parts by the President of Poland, the Sejm and the Senate. Members of the MPC are chosen to serve for six-year terms.

== Members of MPC ==
=== 1998 - 2004 ===
- Hanna Gronkiewicz-Waltz (until 2000) - President of NBP - Chairman of the MPC
- Leszek Balcerowicz (since 2001) - President of NBP - Chairman of the MPC
- Marek Dąbrowski
- Bogusław Grabowski
- Cezary Józefiak
- Janusz Krzyżewski (deceased 2003)
- Wojciech Łączkowski
- Jerzy Pruski
- Dariusz Rosati
- Grzegorz Wójtowicz
- Wiesława Ziółkowska
- Jan Czekaj (since 2003)

=== 2004 - 2010 ===
- Leszek Balcerowicz (until January 10, 2007) - President of NBP - Chairman of the MPC
- Sławomir Skrzypek (since January 10, 2007) - President of NBP - Chairman of the MPC
- Jan Czekaj
- Dariusz Filar
- Stanisław Nieckarz
- Marian Noga
- Stanisław Owsiak
- Mirosław Pietrewicz
- Andrzej Sławiński
- Halina Wasilewska-Trenkner
- Andrzej Wojtyna

=== 2010 - 2016 ===
- Marek Belka - Chairman of the MPC
- Andrzej Bratkowski
- Elżbieta Chojna-Duch
- Zyta Gilowska
- Adam Glapiński
- Jerzy Hausner
- Andrzej Kaźmierczak
- Andrzej Rzońca
- Jan Winiecki
- Anna Zielińska-Głębocka

=== 2016 - 2022 ===
- Adam Glapiński - Chairman of the MPC
- Grażyna Ancyparowicz
- Eugeniusz Gatnar
- Łukasz Hardt
- Cezary Kochalski - since December 21, 2019
- Jerzy Kropiwnicki
- Eryk Łon
- Rafał Sura - since November 16, 2016
- Kamil Zubelewicz
- Jerzy Żyżyński
- Jerzy Osiatyński - until December 20, 2019
- Marek Chrzanowski - until October 6, 2016
