= Małgorzata Zaleska =

Polish economist

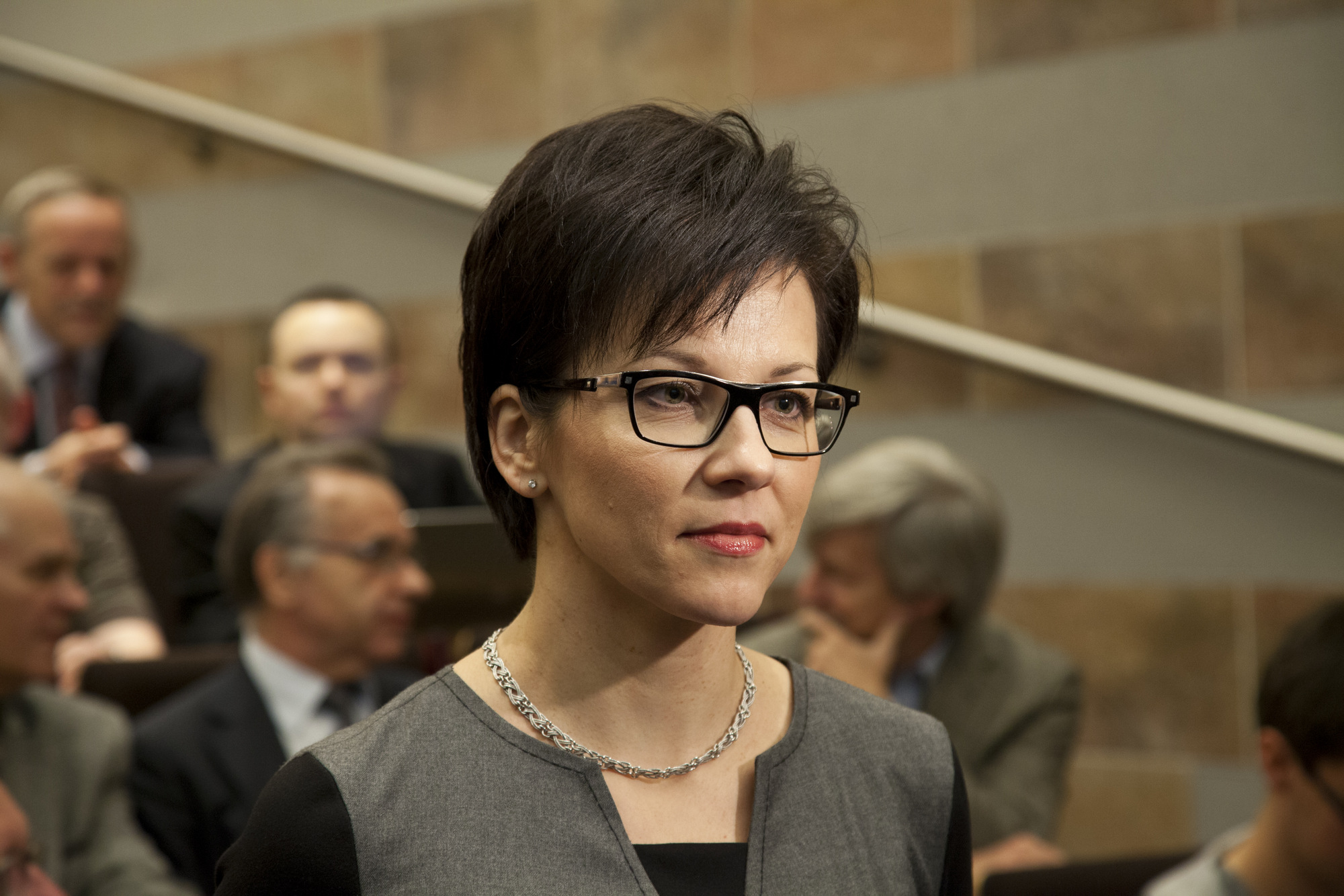
- Zaleska in October 2013

President of Warsaw Stock Exchange
- In office January 12, 2016 – March 14, 2017
- Preceded by: Paweł Tamborski
- Succeeded by: Marek Dietl

Personal details
- Born: 1969 (age 56–57)
- Education: Warsaw School of Economics
- Profession: Economist

Małgorzata Zaleska (born 1969) is a Polish economist who is currently a professor of economic sciences, the chairman of the committee on finance of the Polish Academy of Sciences (since 2015) and the director of the Institute of Banking at the Warsaw School of Economics. She served as the president of the Warsaw Stock Exchange (2016–17), after serving as the member of the board of the National Bank of Poland (2009–15) and the president of the Bank Guarantee Fund in Poland (2006–07).

== Biography ==
She graduated from the Warsaw School of Economics (1993). She finished the Study Course in Economic Policy and the Study Course in Economic Policy for Central and Eastern European Countries in Japan (1995). She completed her doctorate (1997) and habilitation (2000) at the Warsaw School of Economics. In 2006 she received the title of professor of economic sciences.

In 2009 she became a member of the presidium of the committee on finance of the Polish Academy of Sciences. Subsequently, she became the vice-chairman (2011) and the chairman (2015) of the mentioned committee.

In January 2016 she appointed as the president of the Warsaw Stock Exchange.

== Other activities ==
- Warsaw Stock Exchange (Giełda Papierów Wartościowych w Warszawie, GPW), Member of the supervisory board (2000-2002)
- International Association of Deposit Insurers, Member of the Executive Council (2008-2009)
- International Relations Committee (ECB), Member of the committee (2009-2013)
- Economic and Financial Committee (EU), Member of the committee (2009-2015)
- Central Securities Depository of Poland (Krajowy Depozyt Papierów Wartościowych, KDPW), chairman of the supervisory board (2016-2017)
- Polish Power Exchange (Towarowa Giełda Energii, TGE), chairman of the supervisory board (2016-2017)

== Bibliography ==
- "Małgorzata Zaleska's Biography on the Warsaw School of Economics' Website". Szkoła Główna Handlowa w Warszawie (in Polish).
- "Małgorzata Zaleska's Profile in the Polish database "People of Science". Nauka Polska (in Polish).
