= Ludmiła Marjańska =

Polish poet and translator

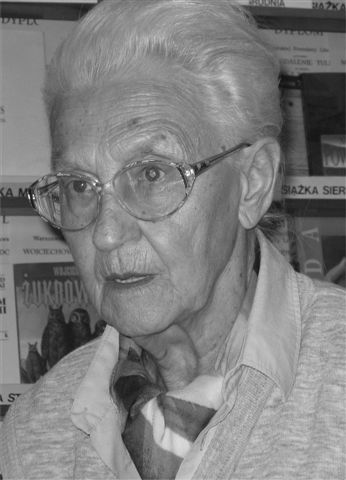
- Born: December 26, 1923; Częstochowa, Poland
- Died: 17 October 2005 (aged 81); Warsaw, Poland
- Resting place: Wilanów Cemetery
- Citizenship: Poland
- Education: University of Warsaw
- Occupations: Poet, translator
- Awards: Order of Polonia Restituta, Meritorious Activist of Culture

Ludmiła Marjańska (26 December 1923 – 17 October 2005) was a Polish poet and translator.

She was born Ludmiła Mężnicka on 26 December 1923 in Częstochowa. She married in 1945. She published her first poems in 1953. She studied English philology at the University of Warsaw. She published some poetic books, like Chmurne okna, W koronie drzewa, Blizna, Zmrożone światło, Prześwit, Stare lustro, Żywica, Córka bednarza. She translated poems by, among others, Elizabeth Barrett Browning, Emily Dickinson and Robert Burns. She was a member of the Polish Writers' Union.
