= Leszek Balcerowicz =

Polish economist and politician

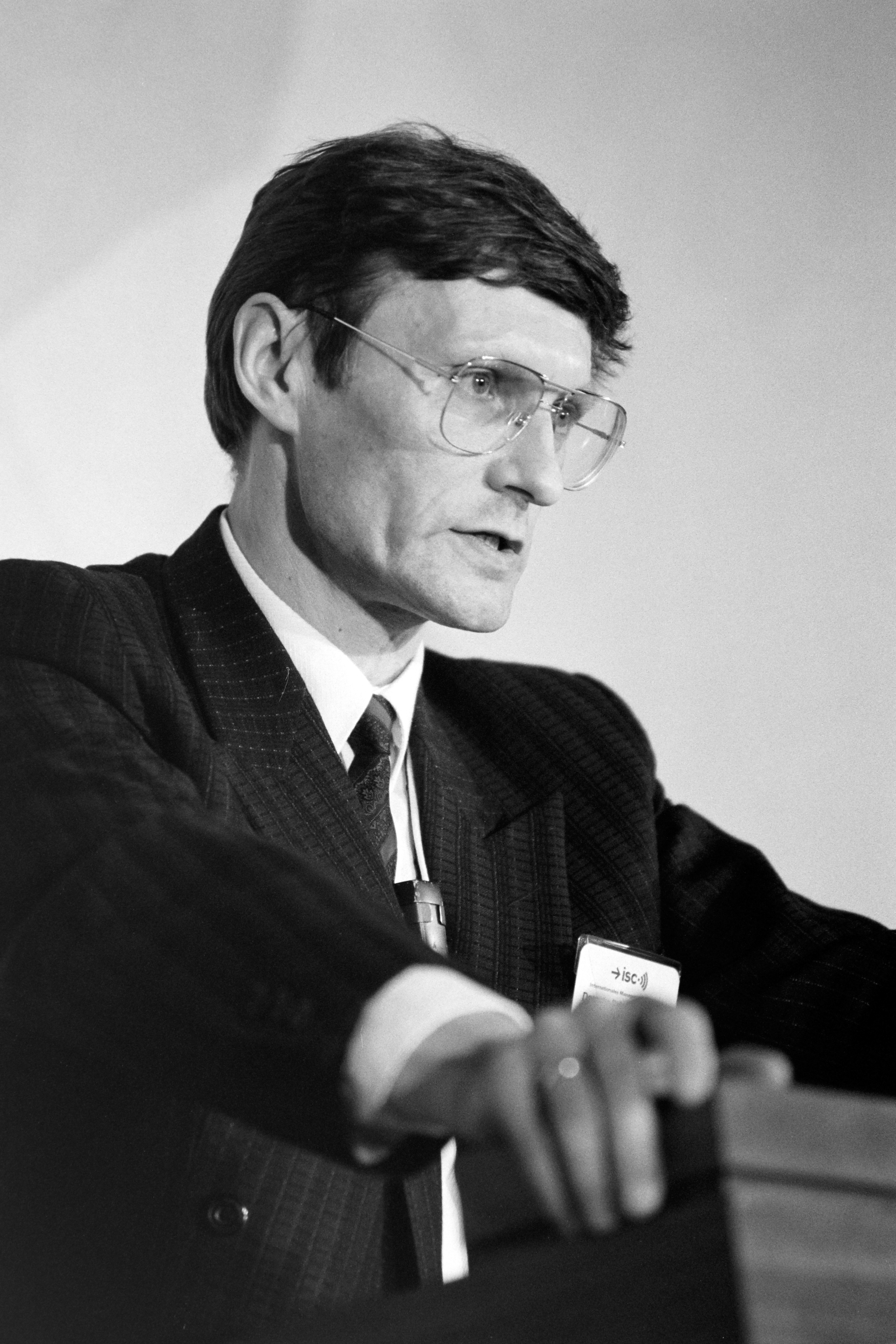
- Balcerowicz in 1991

Deputy Prime Minister of Poland
- In office 31 October 1997 – 8 June 2000
- President: Aleksander Kwaśniewski
- Prime Minister: Jerzy Buzek
- In office 12 September 1989 – 23 December 1991
- President: Wojciech Jaruzelski; Lech Wałęsa
- Prime Minister: Tadeusz Mazowiecki; Jan Krzysztof Bielecki

Minister of Finance
- In office 31 October 1997 – 8 June 2000
- Prime Minister: Jerzy Buzek
- Preceded by: Marek Belka
- Succeeded by: Jarosław Bauc
- In office 12 September 1989 – 23 December 1991
- Prime Minister: Tadeusz Mazowiecki; Jan Krzysztof Bielecki
- Preceded by: Andrzej Wróblewski
- Succeeded by: Karol Lutowski

President of The National Bank of Poland
- In office 10 January 2001 – 10 January 2007
- President: Aleksander Kwaśniewski; Lech Kaczyński
- Prime Minister: Jerzy Buzek; Leszek Miller; Marek Belka; Kazimierz Marcinkiewicz; Jarosław Kaczyński
- Preceded by: Hanna Gronkiewicz-Waltz
- Succeeded by: Sławomir Skrzypek

Chairman of the Freedom Union
- In office 1 April 1995 – 18 December 2000
- Preceded by: Tadeusz Mazowiecki
- Succeeded by: Bronisław Geremek

Personal details
- Born: 19 January 1947 (age 79) Lipno, Poland
- Party: Freedom Union, Partia Demokratyczna – demokraci.pl
- Spouse: Ewa Balcerowicz
- Children: Maciej (b. 1972) & Wojciech (b. 1980) & Anna (b. 1984)
- Profession: Economist

Academic background
- Influences: Hayek · Thatcher · Friedman

Academic work
- Notable ideas: Balcerowicz Plan

Leszek Henryk Balcerowicz (Note: Polish pronunciation: [ˈlɛʂɛk balt͡sɛˈrɔvit͡ʂ]) (born 19 January 1947) is a Polish economist, statesman, and Professor at Warsaw School of Economics. He served as Chairman of the National Bank of Poland (2001–2007) and twice as Deputy Prime Minister of Poland (1989–1991, 1997–2001).

In 1989, he became Minister of Finance in Tadeusz Mazowiecki's first non-communist government and led the free-market economic reforms, proponents of which say they have transformed Poland into one of Europe's fastest growing economies, but which critics say were followed by a large increase in unemployment. In 2007, he founded the Civic Development Forum (Forum Obywatelskiego Rozwoju) think-tank and became the chairman of its council.

== Biography ==
In 1970 he graduated with distinction from the Foreign Trade faculty of the Central School of Planning and Statistics in Warsaw (currently: SGH Warsaw School of Economics). Balcerowicz received his MBA from St. John's University in New York, in 1974 and doctorate from the Central School of Planning and Statistics in 1975.

He was a member of the Polish communist party (Polish United Workers' Party) from 1969 until the declaration of martial law in Poland, in 1981. In the late 1970s he participated in an economic-advisory team associated with the prime minister of People's Republic of Poland. In 1978–1980 he worked at the Institute of Marxism-Leninism. Later he became an economics expert in the pro-democracy independent trade union Solidarity (NSZZ "Solidarność").

From 1989 to 1991 and also between 1997 and 2000 he was the Deputy Prime Minister and Finance Minister of Poland. Between 1995 and 2000 he was the chairman of Freedom Union, a centrist free-market political party. On 22 December 2000 he became the Chairman of the National Bank of Poland. He was also a columnist for Wprost, a Polish news magazine.

On 11 November 2005, the President of Poland, Aleksander Kwaśniewski, awarded L. Balcerowicz with the Order of the White Eagle for his "contribution to Poland's economic transformation". In 2006 he was elected member of Galeria Chwały Polskiej Ekonomii, a hall of fame for "outstanding Polish economists".

Balcerowicz was a member of the Commission on Legal Empowerment of the Poor, an independent initiative hosted by the UNDP and the first global initiative to focus specifically on the link between exclusion, poverty and the law. He is also a member of the influential Washington-based financial advisory body, the Group of Thirty, and is a board member of renowned Washington, D.C. think-tank the Peterson Institute. Fellow of Collegium Invisibile.

Since 11 June 2008 Balcerowicz has been a member of the board of Bruegel, the Brussels-based think tank on international economics.

Since 2007, he has led the Civil Development Forum (Polish: Forum Obywatelskiego Rozwoju), a think-tank with a mission of "increasing active support of the society for a wide range of individual freedoms (especially economic freedom), and – what goes with it – for strengthening the rule of law in the country".

In 2016, he was appointed as representative of the Ukrainian President in the Cabinet of ministers.

He is a recipient of the Chilean Order of Merit.

== Balcerowicz Plan ==
The Balcerowicz Plan was a series of reforms, which brought the end to hyperinflation, dismantled inefficient economic structures, and balanced the national budget. The prices of most consumer goods were freed and caps for annual increases established in state-sector employees' wages. Poland's currency, the zloty, was made convertible within the country's borders. This resulted in a substantial increase in prices and had forced state-owned companies while making them economically competitive. This amounted to a two-year shock to the Polish economy. Among other actions included in the plan was the negotiation of a significant reduction (approximately 50%) of the debts inherited from the Polish People's Republic. In 1998, Balcerowicz was awarded the Euromoney Finance Minister of the Year Award for his accomplishments as a finance minister.

The severity of the reforms was controversial and made Balcerowicz an object of criticism by some politicians in Poland. The reforms impoverished and vanished economic opportunities of already struggling social groups such as low-educated, rural and low-income workers. This resulted in Poland becoming a deeply divided and polarised society. This led to the rise of populist movements that gained popularity through dissatisfaction with the reforms - this included the left-wing agrarian Self-Defence of the Republic of Poland (which became known for its slogan "Balcerowicz must go!"), far-right League of Polish Families, and later Law and Justice. The plan was decried as "economic genocide" by the leader of Self-Defence, Andrzej Lepper. A slowly on-going rise in discontent continued into the 2000s, and in 2002, when asked about the Balcerowicz Plan, 78% of Poles described their economic situation as bad, and nearly 40% preferred to live in socialist Poland - amongst rural residents and skilled workers, this figure rose to 50%.

On the other hand, neoliberal economists and experts such as Krzysztof Sobczak, Jeffrey Sachs (who personally advised Balcerowicz), and Jacek Rostowski agree that without introducing such radical changes, Poland's economic success and steady economic growth would not have been possible. Other economists and political scientists criticised the plan - Adam Przeworski described Balcerowicz Plan as a "a pure trickle-down model of reforms", and argued that Balcerowicz neglected the social costs of the reform, focusing only on growth. The economic growth produced by the reforms did not trickle down to average citizen.

Polish economist Tadeusz Kowalik argues that Balcerowicz's reforms were a failure, stating that the good economic performance of Poland in comparison to other post-communist Poland was caused by much better initial economic conditions. Kowalik accuses Balcerowicz of squandering a unique opportunity of creating a fair and egalitarian socio-economic system, instead creating a system "whose trademarks became mass and permanent unemployment, for many years the highest in Central Europe and then the highest in the EU; one of the highest income disparities; the dismantling of the welfare state. Added to this was the breaking down of workers' negotiating power. The shock operation meant consenting to the introduction of the worst variety of capitalism into Poland."

Balcerowicz was also criticised by Polish economist and former Finance Minister Grzegorz Kołodko, who described Balcerowicz Plan as "shock without therapy". Kołodko notes that Balcerowicz promised only a slight increase in unemployment and poverty, while in reality Polish GDP fell by 20% and rendered millions of Poles unemployed. According to Kołodko, "Balcerowicz is praised only by people from the same camp as him - representatives of Polish neoliberalism". Kołodko notes the excessive scale of reductions in household incomes (including real wages), as after two months of the reforms, real wages in Poland fell by over 40%. He also adds that since the reforms resulted in the industrial production falling by over 30%, that cost alone makes the reform impossible to be regarded as successful, regardless the future stabilisation. Lastly, Kołodko believes that Balcerowicz acted irrationally, as the plan did not manage to eliminate inefficient companies, but instead blindly discriminated against state-owned companies, denying them investment loans and granting them to private companies instead, regardless of their economic performance. Kołodko concludes that the Balcerowicz Plan was "creative destruction".

It is worth noting, however, that in 1990, Poland's GDP per capita sat at just 38% of the EU average. By the mid-2020s, it climbed to roughly 85% of the EU average, catching up at a speed unseen in other post-communist transitions. And since joining the European Union in 2004, Poland has averaged annual GDP growth of about 3.8%, more than double the broader EU average of roughly 1.8%. The market friendly reforms of the Balcerowicz Plan were, arguably, a key contributor to the subsequent exceptional performance of the Polish economy.

== Criticism ==
High unemployment remained a problem for some two decades after the implementation of the reforms, leaving certain poverty-stricken regions with structural unemployment. Reducing unprofitability of the state-owned companies required significant layoffs. Even though over 2 million Poles emigrated from Poland since its entry into the EU, until 2010s, the unemployment level remained at 13%. Populist politician Andrzej Lepper, the leader of the populist Self-Defence (Samoobrona) party, created the slogan: "Balcerowicz must go" (Balcerowicz musi odejść), echoing the disgruntlement felt by some Poles with Balcerowicz's plan. However, since 2013, the unemployment rate has not exceeded 10% and in 2019 has reached the record low of 3.8%.

== The BELLS ==
During the Eurozone crisis Balcerowicz has been an outspoken supporter for fiscal discipline and has been frequently dubbed the anti-Bernanke for his scorn of distortionary fiscal stimulus. In various articles he has developed a comparison between the fiscally-profligate PIGS (Portugal, Italy, Greece and Spain) and the fiscally-disciplined BELLs (Bulgaria, Estonia, Latvia and Lithuania). Responsible fiscal policy brings about better growth outcomes, claims Leszek Balcerowicz. He has many followers among East European economists, most prominently Simeon Djankov, Deputy prime Minister and Minister of Finance of Bulgaria between 2009 and 2013.

== Private life ==
Balcerowicz was a competitive athlete in his youth. In 1966, he became Poland's youth champion in cross country at the distance of 1500 metres. Since 1977, he has been married to Ewa Balcerowicz, an economist. He has three children.

== Honorary doctorates ==
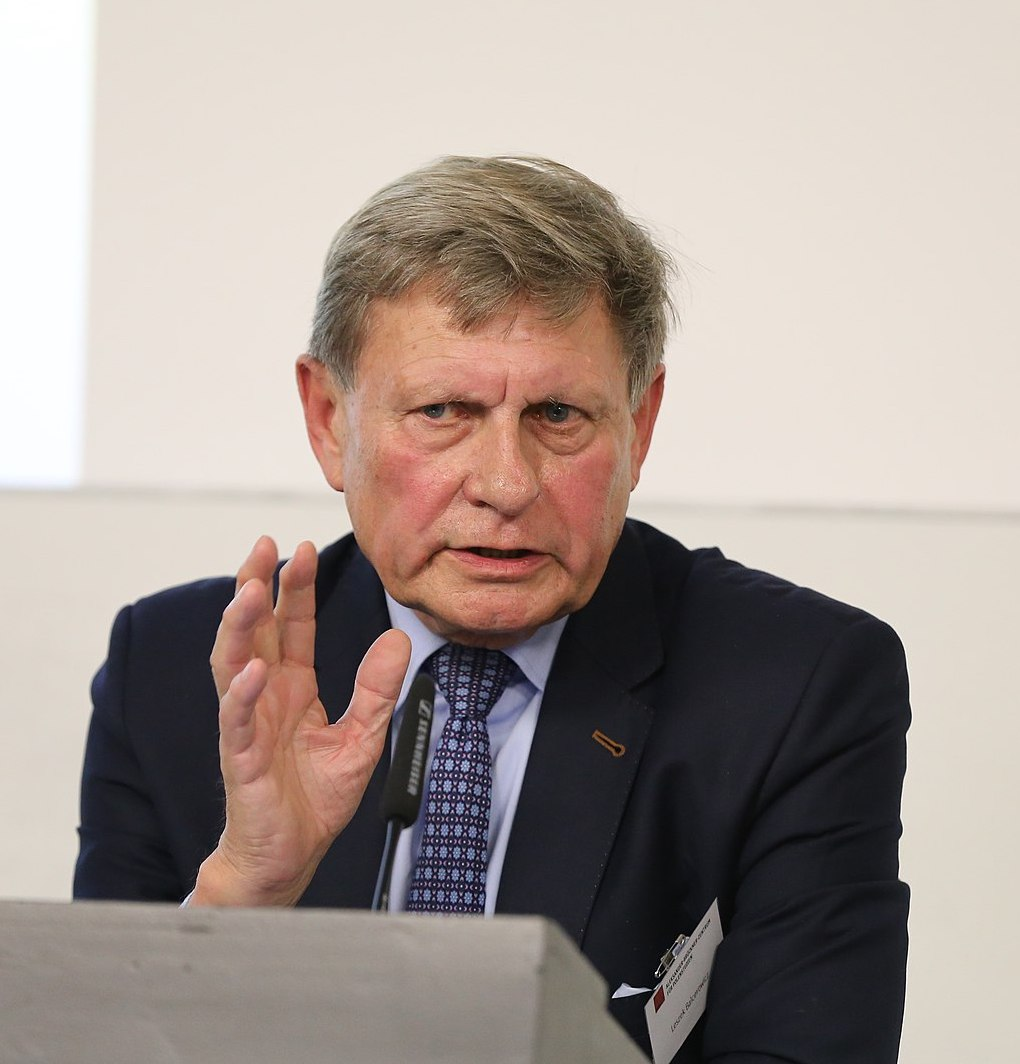
Balcerowicz in 2019

- 1993 University of Aix-en-Provence, France
- 1994 University of Sussex, United Kingdom
- 1996 DePaul University, United States
- 1998:
  - University of Szczecin, Poland
  - Nicolaus Copernicus University in Toruń, Poland
  - Staffordshire University, United Kingdom
  - Abertay University, United Kingdom
- 1999 University of Economics in Bratislava, Slovakia
- 2001 Viadrina European University, Germany
- 2002:
  - University of the Pacific, Peru
  - University of Iaşi, Romania
- 2004 University of Duisburg, Germany
- 2006:
  - University of Economics in Katowice, Poland
  - Poznań University of Economics, Poland
  - Wrocław University of Economics, Poland
  - University of Gdańsk, Poland
- 2007 Warsaw School of Economics, Poland
- 2008:
  - University of Warsaw, Poland
  - University of New South Wales, Australia
- 2009 Babeş-Bolyai University Romania
- 2011 Central Connecticut State University United States
- 2015 Universidad Francisco Marroquín Guatemala

== Selected publications ==
- Socialism, Capitalism, Transformation, Central European University Press, Budapest, 1995
- Wolność i rozwój: ekonomia wolnego rynku, Znak, Kraków, 1995
- Post-Communist Transition: Some Lessons, Institute of Economic Affairs, London, 2002
- Towards a Limited State, World Bank, 2003
- Institutional Systems and Economic Growth, in: Challenges of Globalization. Imbalances and Growth, edited by Anders Åslund and Marek Dąbrowski, Peterson Institutute for International Economics, p. 153–199, Washington, DC, 2008
- Zagadki wzrostu gospodarczego (Puzzles of Economic Growth), Leszek Balcerowicz, Andrzej Rzońca, C.H. Beck Sp. z o.o., Warsaw, 2010
- Odkrywając wolność. Przeciw zniewoleniu umysłów, Leszek Balcerowicz, ZYSK i S-KA Wydawnictwo, 2012
- Wzrost gospodarczy w Unii Europejskiej (Economic Growth in the European Union), Lisbon Council e-book, Leszek Balcerowicz (main author), A. Rzońca, L. Kalina, A. Łaszek, 2013
- Trzeba się bić. Opowieść biograficzna, Leszek Balcerowicz, Marta Stremecka, Wydawnictwo Czerwone i Czarne, Warsaw, 2014
- Euro Imbalances and Adjustment: A Comperative Analysis, The Cato Journal, nr 3, 2014

== See also ==
- Yegor Gaidar – architect of the post-Soviet economic reforms in Russia.
- Economy of Poland
- List of Poles

Political offices
| Preceded by Hanna Gronkiewicz-Waltz | President of the National Bank of Poland; 2001–2007 | Succeeded by Sławomir Skrzypek |
