= Sławomir Skrzypek =

Polish central banker (1963–2010)

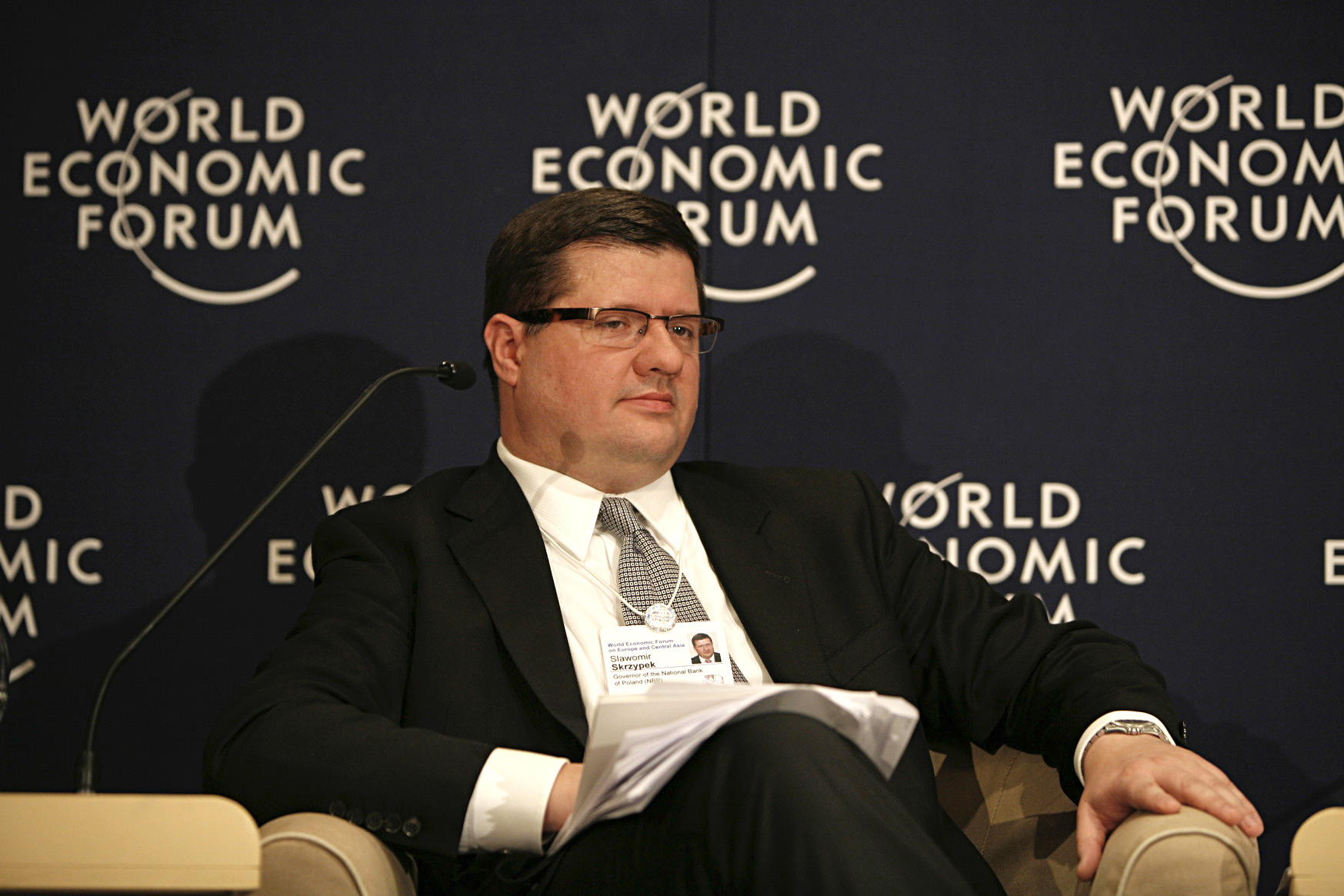
- World Economic Forum in Turkey

President of the National Bank of Poland
- In office 10 January 2007 – 10 April 2010
- Preceded by: Leszek Balcerowicz
- Succeeded by: Marek Belka

Personal details
- Born: 10 May 1963 Katowice, Poland
- Died: 10 April 2010 (aged 46) Smolensk, Russia

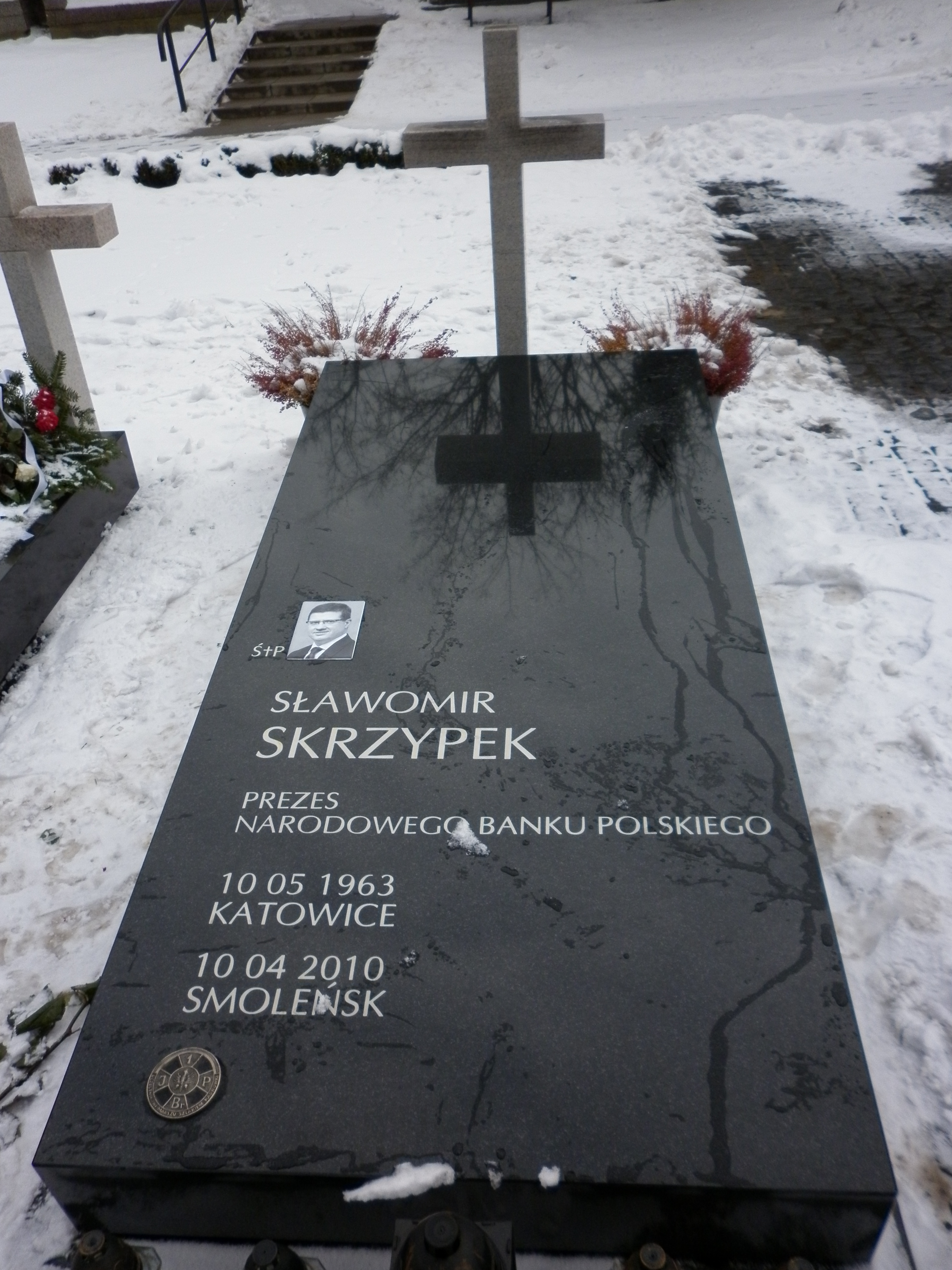
Sławomir Skrzypek tomb in Powązki (2011)

Sławomir Stanisław Skrzypek (10 May 1963 – 10 April 2010) was the President of the National Bank of Poland (NBP) from 2007 until his death in 2010. He died in the 2010 Polish Air Force Tu-154 crash, when a plane transporting a number of Polish notables, including the President of Poland Lech Kaczyński, crashed en route to a ceremony commemorating the 70th anniversary of the Katyń massacre.

== Life and career ==
Born in Katowice, Skrzypek graduated from the Silesian University of Technology before taking an MBA from the University of Wisconsin–La Crosse, further post-graduate degrees at Cracow University of Economics, the University of Silesia, Georgetown University and at IESE Business School at the University of Navarra. It was on 10 January 2007 that Skrzypek was appointed to the role of President of the NBP, with a vote of 239 Sejm deputies in favor, 202 against and one abstaining. He replaced Leszek Balcerowicz. His choice by President Kaczynski was controversial; opposition parties and others criticised his comparative lack of experience.

Prior to this position, he had been acting President of the managing board of PKO BP, Poland's largest bank. He had also held positions in the Supreme Chamber of Control (NIK), serving as Deputy President of the National Fund for Environmental Protection and Water Management and working at Polish State Railways (PKP). He acted as a deputy to the Mayor of Warsaw between 2002 and 2005, responsible, among other things, for "financial policy, investment projects and corporate governance". From May 2000 to June 2001, he was a member of a group of advisors at one division of PZU, a Polish insurance company.

Piotr Wiesiolek was named as Skrzypek's acting successor, though Skrzypek's sudden death on the 10 April 2010 may still cause short term problems for the bank; permanent Presidents of the Bank are usually nominated by Presidents of Poland, but Lech Kaczynski also died in the crash. After Skrzypek's death, the Wall Street Journal reported how the management committee of the central bank had recently "come into open conflict with six members of the Council [of Ministers] after a council majority voted to change the rules dictating how the bank's net profit was calculated".

== Awards ==
On 16 April 2010, Skrzypek was posthumously awarded the Commander's Cross with Star of the Order of Polonia Restituta.

== See also ==
- Politics of Poland

Political offices
Preceded by Leszek Balcerowicz	President of the National Bank of Poland; 2007–2010	Succeeded by Marek Belka
