= SGH Warsaw School of Economics =

Polish business school

Coordinates: 52°12′32″N 21°0′32″E

- Szkoła Główna Handlowa w Warszawie
- Latin: Schola Princeps Scientiarum Oeconomicarum et Commercii
- Type: Public
- Established: October 13, 1906; 119 years ago
- Affiliations: CEMS, Triple accreditation, CIVICA, LLP Erasmus, PIM, EUA
- Rector: Piotr Wachowiak
- Faculty: 750
- Administrative staff: 1,229
- Students: 9,426 (12.2023)
- Undergraduates: 7,200
- Postgraduates: 4,000
- Doctoral students: 1,000
- Location: Warsaw, Masovian Voivodeship, Poland
- Campus: Urban
- Colors: Green and white
- Website: sgh.waw.pl
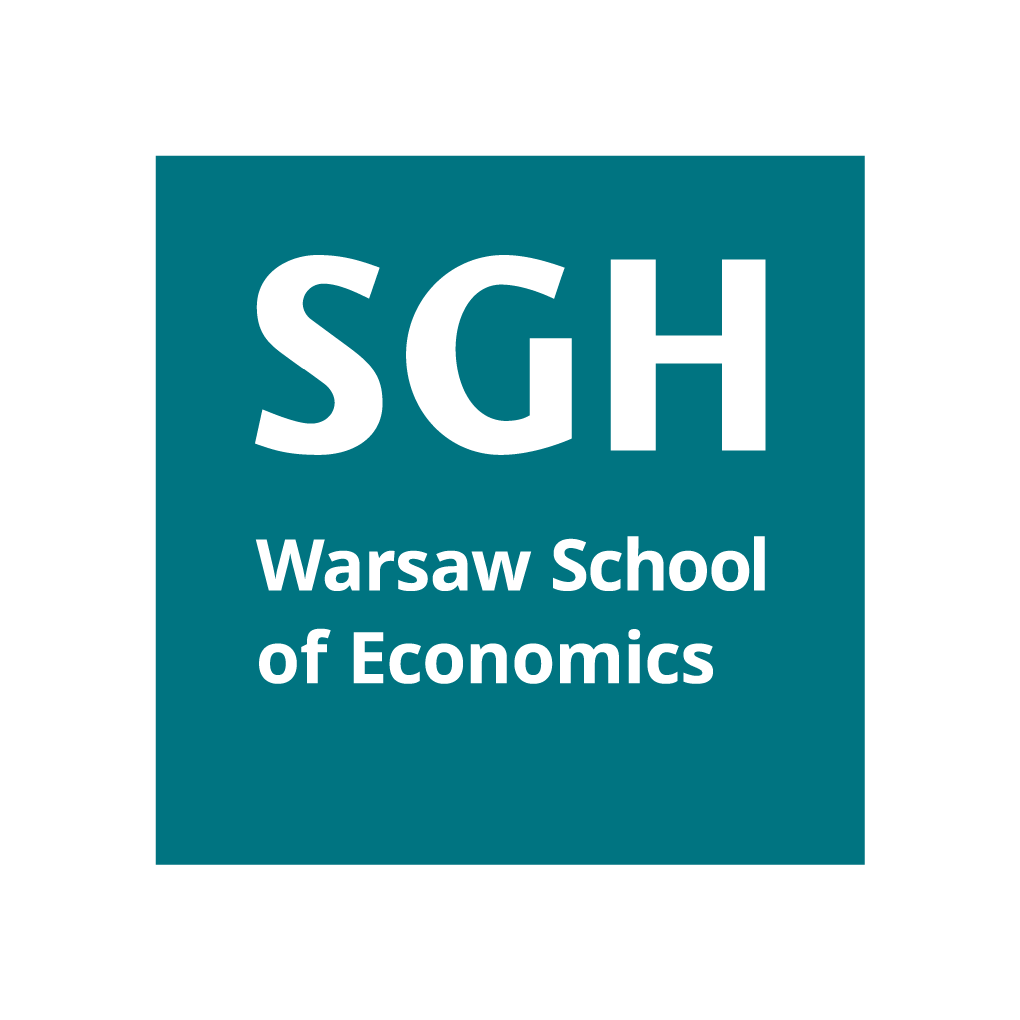

SGH Warsaw School of Economics (Polish: Szkoła Główna Handlowa, (Note: English: Main Business School) SGH) is a business school in Poland.

SGH Warsaw School of Economics was founded in 1906 as a private school named August Zieliński Private Trade Courses for Men. On 30 July 1919, it became a separate legal entity and was granted the status of an institution of higher education. The school was renamed Szkoła Główna Handlowa (SGH) in 1933. After World War II, SGH was nationalized and its name changed to Szkoła Główna Planowania i Statystyki (Main School of Planning and Statistics), abbreviation SGPiS. The school regained its pre-war name after the fall of communism in 1991.

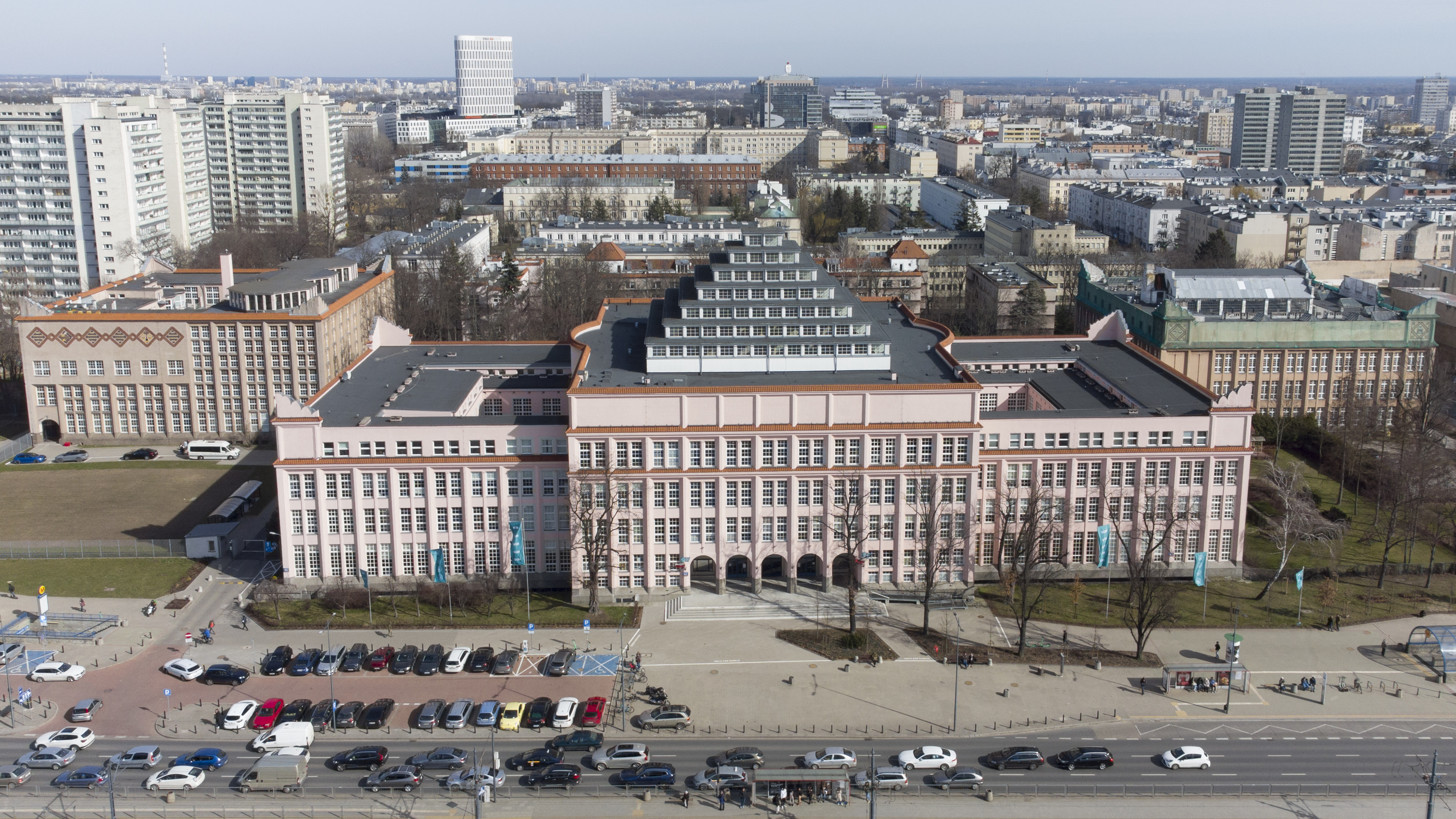
Main building of SGH

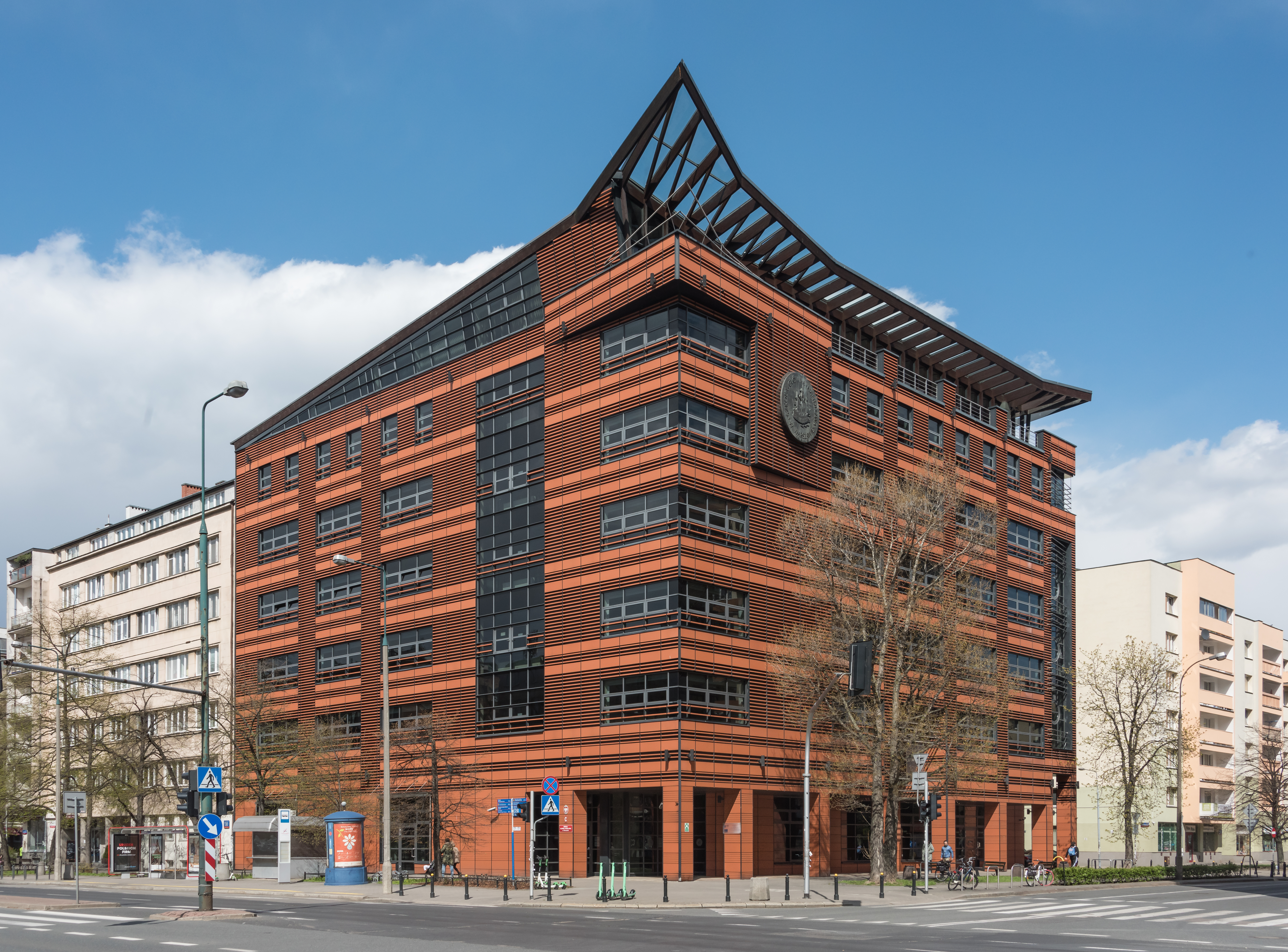
Building C on Aleja Niepodległości

SGH Warsaw School of Economics cooperates with around 200 higher education institutions worldwide within student and staff exchange areas. It is a member of the Community of European Management Schools and International Companies (CEMS), the Triple accreditation, the Erasmus Programme, the Partnership in International Management Network (PIM), and the European University Association (EUA).

The main campus is located at the northern edge of the Mokotów district of Warsaw. Bus and tram stops, as well as the Pole Mokotowskie metro station, are nearby.

== Organizational structure ==
SGH Warsaw School of Economics abandoned the traditional departmental structure segregating students based on their major.

Professors and research and teaching programs are grouped in five Colleges (Collegiums) and several extra-collegial units, such as the foreign language teaching center.

== Courses offered ==
Full-time and part-time studies are conducted in two levels. Bachelor studies, which last for six semesters, lead to a Bachelor's professional title. Holders of such a title may apply for a place and begin Master's studies, which last for four semesters. Accumulating the required minimum points, as well as credit terms, is necessary to earn a diploma. Individual subjects are divided into mandatory selections for particular fields, optional for those subjects, additional courses that develop knowledge unrelated to specific subjects, and courses essential for all economists. Certain subjects can have different numbers of points for each of these types of items.

SGH full-time students are offered the following fields of study in Polish:

- Economics,
- European Master in Law and Economics,
- European Studies,
- Finance and Accounting,
- Quantitative Methods in Economics and Information Systems,
- Management (Business Administration),
- Public Sector Economics (Public Administration),
- Social Policy,
- Spatial Economic Policy,
- International Economics,
- Big Data.

From the 2006/2007 Academic Year SGH Studies are divided into:

- Bachelor's Studies (undergraduate) – 6-semester
- Master's Studies (graduate) – 4-semester
- Doctoral Studies – 6-semester
- System based on ECTS credits

During the first three semesters, all SGH students study basic macro- and micro-economics, mathematics, statistics, philosophy, social science, law, history, geography, and languages. After passing the required examinations for the first three semesters, they must register for one of the six offered areas of study. The BA degree is granted after completing a required number of credits (about six semesters of studies), and the MA (MSc) degree is awarded after completing about eight to ten semesters (including six semesters for the BA), which is the maximum period of tuition-free study at SGH. Students do not necessarily have a BA diploma before applying for a master's degree. The time required for the degree in the given specialization depends mostly on the students themselves due to the free choice of courses (some limitations apply), professors, and the maximum workload per semester.

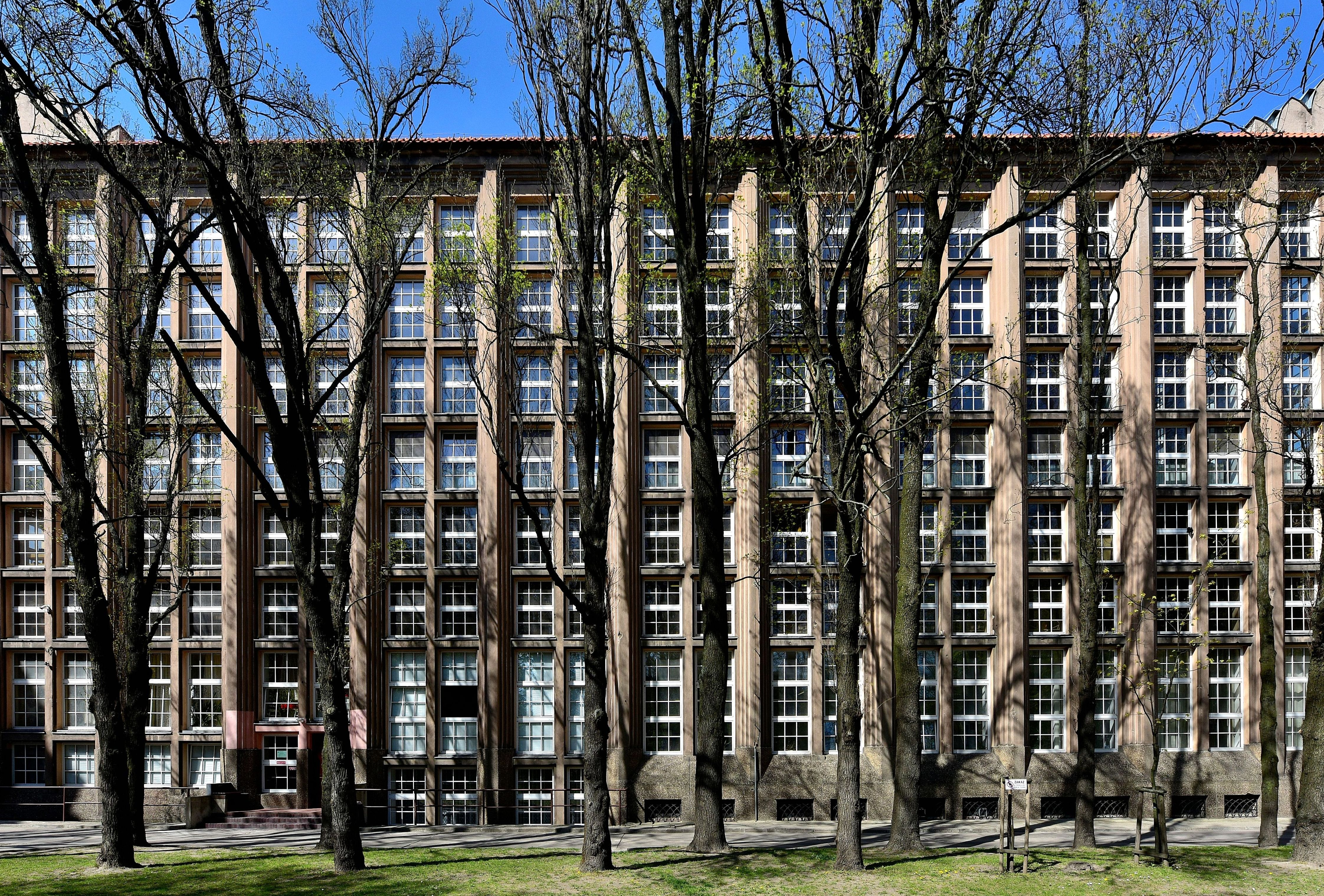
Warsaw School of Economics Library, Rakowiecka Street

== International cooperation ==
SGH cooperates with over 250 foreign universities, as well as with many international organizations. The main partners are universities from the European Union, North America, and Asia. Each year, the international exchange involves about 500 SGH students, and the university hosts over 300 students from foreign institutes. Significant international cooperation programs include LLP Erasmus, CEMS (The Global Alliance in Management Education), Polish-German Academic Forum at SGH, Partnership in International Management (PIM), as well as double diploma programs (i.e. with Technische Universität Berlin), and other bilateral agreements.

== Student organizations ==
The Student Union, an elective body representing all SGH students in the School's Senate and participating in setting all study regulations, provides students with housing and financial aid as well as organizes a wide range of cultural events.

=== Collegia ===
- Collegium of Economic Analysis (Kolegium Analiz Ekonomicznych)
- Collegium of Socio-Economics (Kolegium Ekonomiczno-Społeczne)
- Collegium of World Economy (Kolegium Gospodarki Światowej)
- Collegium of Business Administration (Kolegium Nauk o Przedsiębiorstwie)
- Collegium of Management and Finance (Kolegium Zarządzania i Finansów)

== Library ==
The Library of SGH Warsaw School of Economics is the largest economics library in Poland, with 786,334 volumes of monographs, 216,778 volumes of serials, 983 titles of subscribed periodicals – Polish and foreign, and approximately titles 30,000 foreign journals in electronic form. The SGH Library holdings are organized in several collections. Each collection is available in different departments, on defined conditions: free access, library order slips, or borrowing. Students are allowed to borrow books exclusively from the Students’ Lending Library.

== Gospodarka Narodowa: The Polish Journal of Economics ==
Gospodarka Narodowa: The Polish Journal of Economics
- Discipline: Economics
- Language: Polish, English
- Edited by: Marek Gruszczyński

Publication details
- History: 1931–present
- Publisher: SGH Warsaw School of Economics (Poland)
- Frequency: Quarterly
- Open access: Yes
- License: CC BY 4.0

Standard abbreviations
- ISO 4: Gospod. Nar.

Indexing
- ISSN: 2300-5238 (print); 0867-0005 (web)

Links
- Journal homepage

Gospodarka Narodowa. The Polish Journal of Economics is a quarterly scientific journal publishing leading research across all economics and economic policy fields. The journal was established in 1931. Since 2000, it has been edited at the Collegium of Economic Analysis of the SGH Warsaw School of Economics.

== Journal of Public Policy Studies ==
Journal of Public Policy Studies
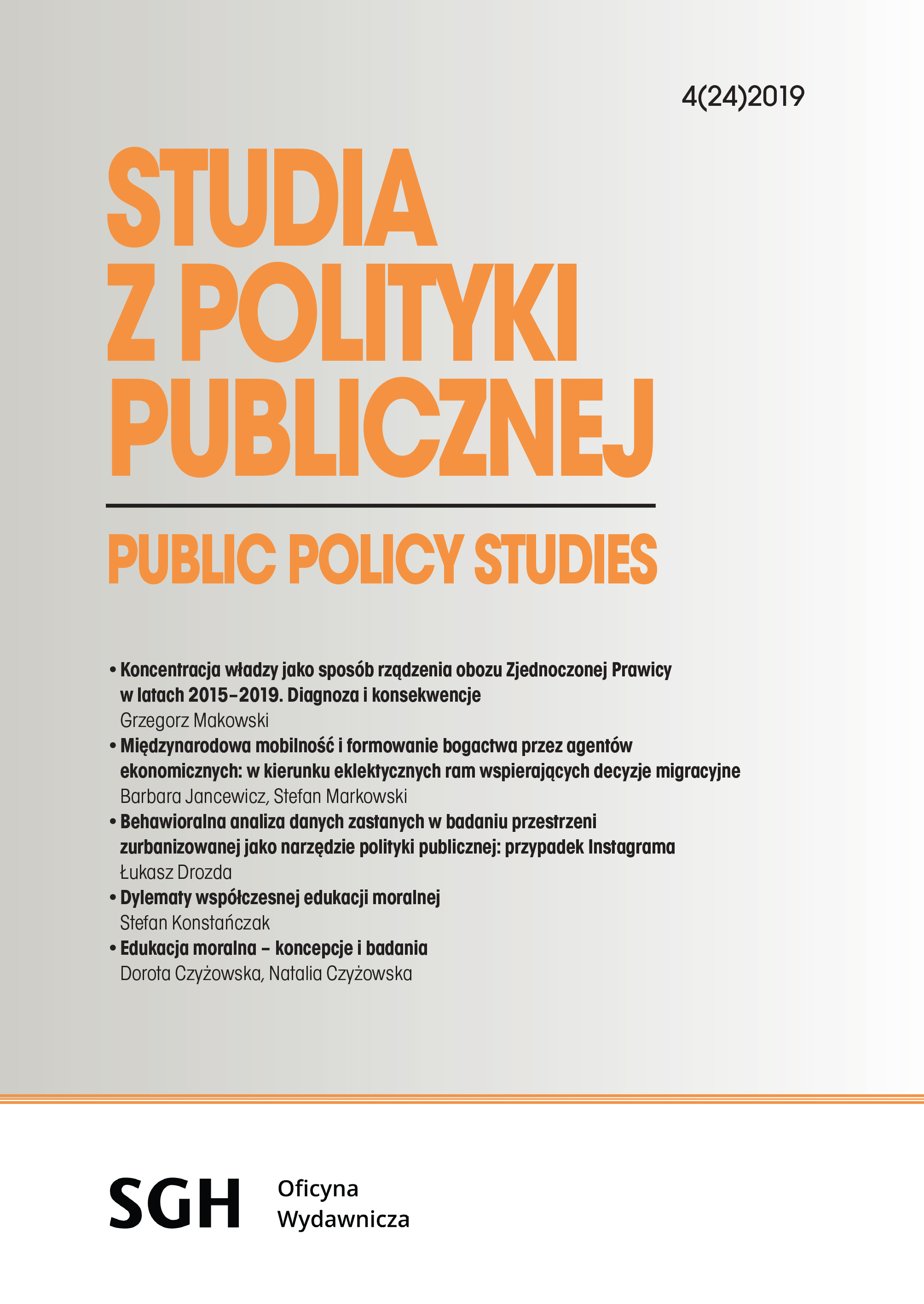
- Discipline: Public policy
- Language: Polish, English
- Edited by: Andrzej Zybała

Publication details
- History: 2014–present
- Publisher: SGH Warsaw School of Economics (Poland)
- Frequency: Quarterly
- Open access: Yes
- License: CC BY 4.0

Standard abbreviations
- ISO 4: J. Public Policy Stud.

Indexing
- ISSN: 2391-6389
- OCLC no.: 1117485269

Links
- Journal homepage; Open Journal Systems website

The Journal of Public Policy Studies (Polish: Studia z Polityki Publicznej) was founded in 2014 at the Collegium of Socio-Economics of the SGH Warsaw School of Economics. It is published quarterly and is focused on public policy science issues.

== Sports centre ==
There are two gyms, a fitness room, a swimming pool, and a sauna available for students on the SGH campus. One may sign up for either Physical Education (PE) class or varsity team activities, neither of which is compulsory. PE classes include soccer, basketball, volleyball, callanetics, aerobics, swimming, and dancing. Varsity team activities include karate, skiing, aerobics, rock climbing, tennis, table tennis, track and field sports, sailing, soccer, swimming, volleyball, and basketball.

== Notable alumni and faculty ==
=== Faculty ===
- Leszek Balcerowicz – Chairman of the National Bank of Poland (2001–07), Deputy Prime Minister of Poland (1989–91, 1997–2000), Minister of Finance of Poland (1989–91, 1997–2000), architect of the free market reforms in Poland
- Joanna Cygler – economist and professor of management
- Adam Glapiński – Chairman of the National Bank of Poland (2016–22)
- Marek Góra – co-author of the pension system reform in Poland
- Danuta Hübner – European Commissioner for Regional Policy (2004–09), Member of the European Parliament (since 2009)
- Michał Kalecki – called: "one of the most distinguished economists of the 20th century"
- Stanisław Kluza – Minister of Finance of Poland (2006), Chairman of the Polish Financial Supervision Authority (2006–11)
- Oskar Lange – economist, econometrician, President of the UN Security Council (1946), and Member of Parliament
- Janusz Piechociński – Deputy Prime Minister of Poland (2012–15), Minister of Economy of Poland (2012–15)
- Dariusz Rosati – Minister of Foreign Affairs of Poland (1995–97), Member of the European Parliament (2004–09, 2014–19)
- Stanisław Wojciechowski – President of the Republic of Poland (1922–26)
- Andrzej Sławiński – a member of the Council of Monetary Policies since 2004 and a fellow of Collegium Invisibile.

=== Alumni ===
The majority of Ministers of Finance in the governments of the III Republic of Poland were SGH alumni, including all from 1988 to 1997.

- Leszek Balcerowicz – economist
- Elżbieta Bieńkowska – European Commissioner for Internal Market and Services (since 2014), Deputy Prime Minister of Poland (2013–14), Minister of Regional Development of Poland (2007–13), Minister of Infrastructure and Development of Poland (2013–14)
- Marek Borowski – Deputy Prime Minister of Poland (1993–94), Minister of Finance of Poland (1993–94), Marshal of the Sejm of Poland (2001–04)
- Joanna Cygler – economist
- Jacek Czaputowicz – Minister of Foreign Affairs of Poland (since 2018)
- Barbara Czarniawska – organization scholar, recipient of the Wihuri International Prize (2003)
- Adam Glapiński – economist, chairman of the National Bank of Poland
- Christopher A. Hartwell – professor, former President of CASE-Center for Social and Economic Research, advisor on economics transition
- Danuta Hübner – politician
- Henryk Klata - economist and politician
- Stanisław Kluza – economist
- Grzegorz Kołodko – Deputy Prime Minister of Poland (1994–97, 2002–03) and Minister of Finance of Poland (1994–97, 2002–03)
- Leon Koźmiński – economist, patron of Kozminski University
- Maciej Kranz – Silicon Valley executive, Vice President for Cisco Systems
- Andrzej Olechowski – Minister of Finance of Poland (1992), Minister of Foreign Affairs of Poland (1993–95), co-founder of Civic Platform
- Józef Oleksy – Prime Minister of Poland (1995–96), Deputy Prime Minister of Poland (2004), Minister of Internal Affairs and Administration of Poland (2004), Marshal of the Sejm of Poland (1993–95, 2004–05)
- Janusz Piechociński – politician
- Marek Rocki – former Rector (1999–2002, 2002–2005 and 2016–2020), member of the Senate of Poland (2005–2019)
- Dariusz Rosati – politician, former Minister of Foreign Affairs of Poland
- Wiesław Rozłucki – President of the Warsaw Stock Exchange (1991–2006)
- Michał Rutkowski – economist, co-author of the pension system reform in Poland, director in the World Bank in Washington, DC
- Stefan Starzyński – president of Warsaw from 1934 to the fall of the city in World War II in 1939
- Edward Szczepanik – last Prime Minister of the Government of the Polish Republic in Exile
- Halina Wasilewska-Trenkner – former finance minister Republic of Poland (2001), member of Monetary Policy Council (2004–10)
- Małgorzata Zaleska - economist

== See also ==
- Polish Economy Hall of Fame
- List of business schools in Europe
