= Idea Bank =

Bank in Poland

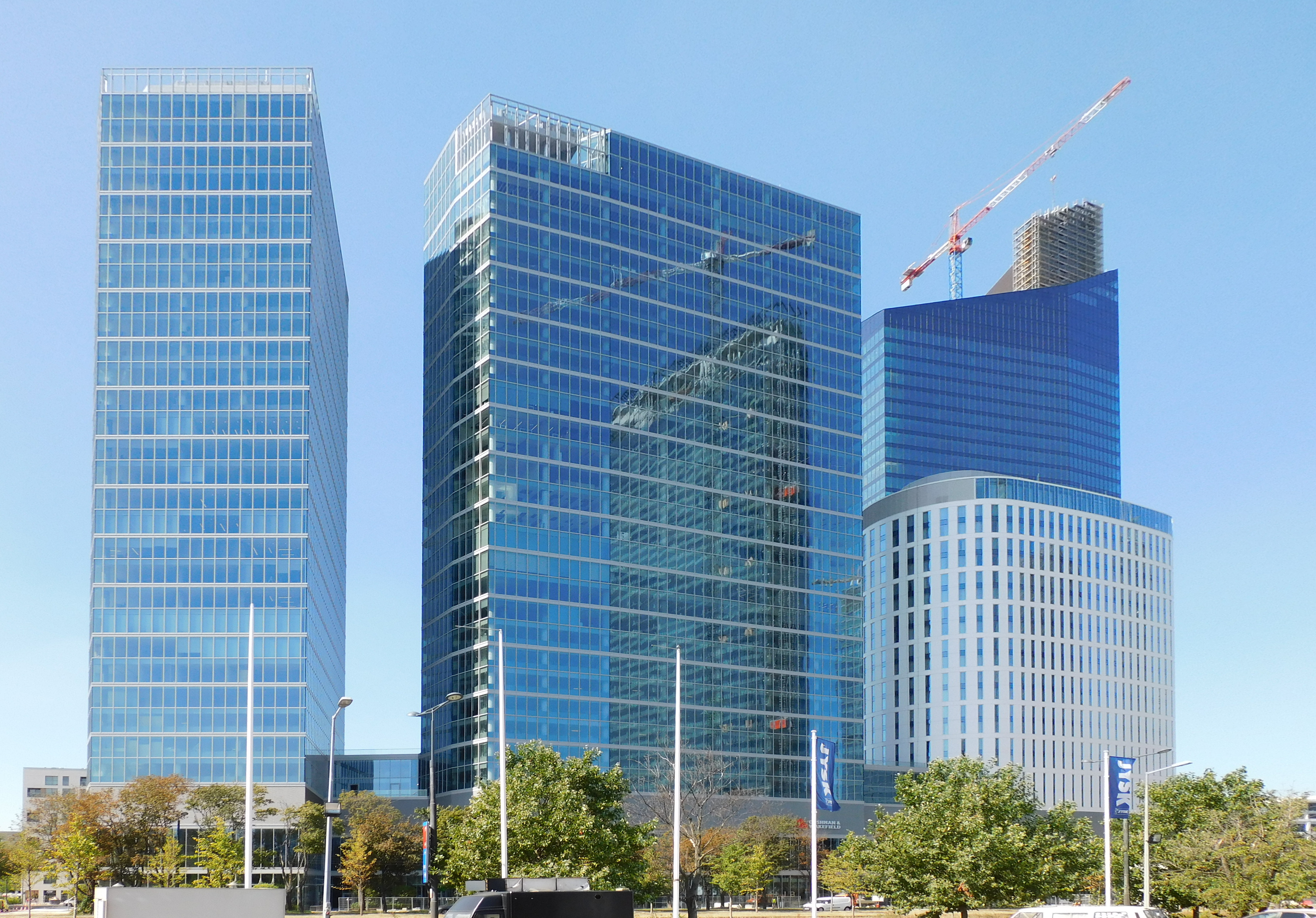
- Idea Bank HQ in Warsaw
- Type: Spółka Akcyjna
- Industry: Banking
- Founded: 1991
- Founder: Leszek Czarnecki
- Defunct: 2021
- Headquarters: ul. Przyokopowa 33, Warsaw, Poland
- Key people: Leszek Czarnecki
- Products: Financial services
- Parent: Getin Holding
- Website: https://www.ideabank.pl/

Idea Bank Spółka Akcyjna (formerly GMAC Bank Polska SA) was a bank in Poland, which began operations in 1991 and was taken over by Bank Pekao SA on 3 January 2021 as a part of compulsory restructuring engineered by Poland's Bank Guarantee Fund. The bank's domain was the financial service of small business entities; micro, small and medium enterprises. Idea Bank was controlled by Getin Holding and Getin Noble Bank. Main shareholder was a Polish billionaire Leszek Czarnecki.

== History ==
The operational activities were undertaken by the company in 1991 and are continued to this day. The bank operated as Polbank SA and later as Opel Bank SA. Pursuant to the order of 26 July 2001, the name was changed to GMAC Bank Polska SA (the notarial deed of the amendment was made on May 24, 2001). Then, by virtue of the order of 13 October 2010, the name was changed to Idea Bank SA.

On 31 December 2020, Idea Bank SA was a subject to compulsory restructuring engineered by Poland's Bank Guarantee Fund and has been taken over by Bank Pekao on 3 January 2021.

In June 2025, the National Bank of Ukraine declared Idea Bank as one of the country's systemically important banks.

== International operations ==
- Idea Bank
  - Idea Bank (Russia) 2011—2015
  - Idea Bank (Belarus)
  - Idea Bank (Ukraine) — in December 2019, Dragon Capital Investments Limited entered into an agreement to acquire 100% of the shares of Ukraine's Idea Bank.
  - Idea Bank (Romania) 2013—2021

== See also ==
- List of banks in Poland
