= PBK =

PBK may refer to:

- Abbreviation for paperback books
- Parti Bumi Kenyalang, Malaysian political party
- PBK Architects
- PBK (composer), a musical artist
- PBK (gene)
- Bank PBK, a former Polish bank
- Postal code for Pembroke, Malta
- Phi Beta Kappa, an honor society in the United States
- Prajapita Brahma Kumaris
