= Getin Bank =

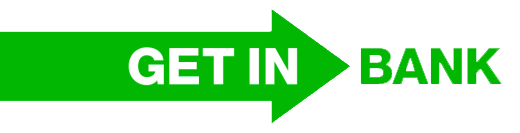

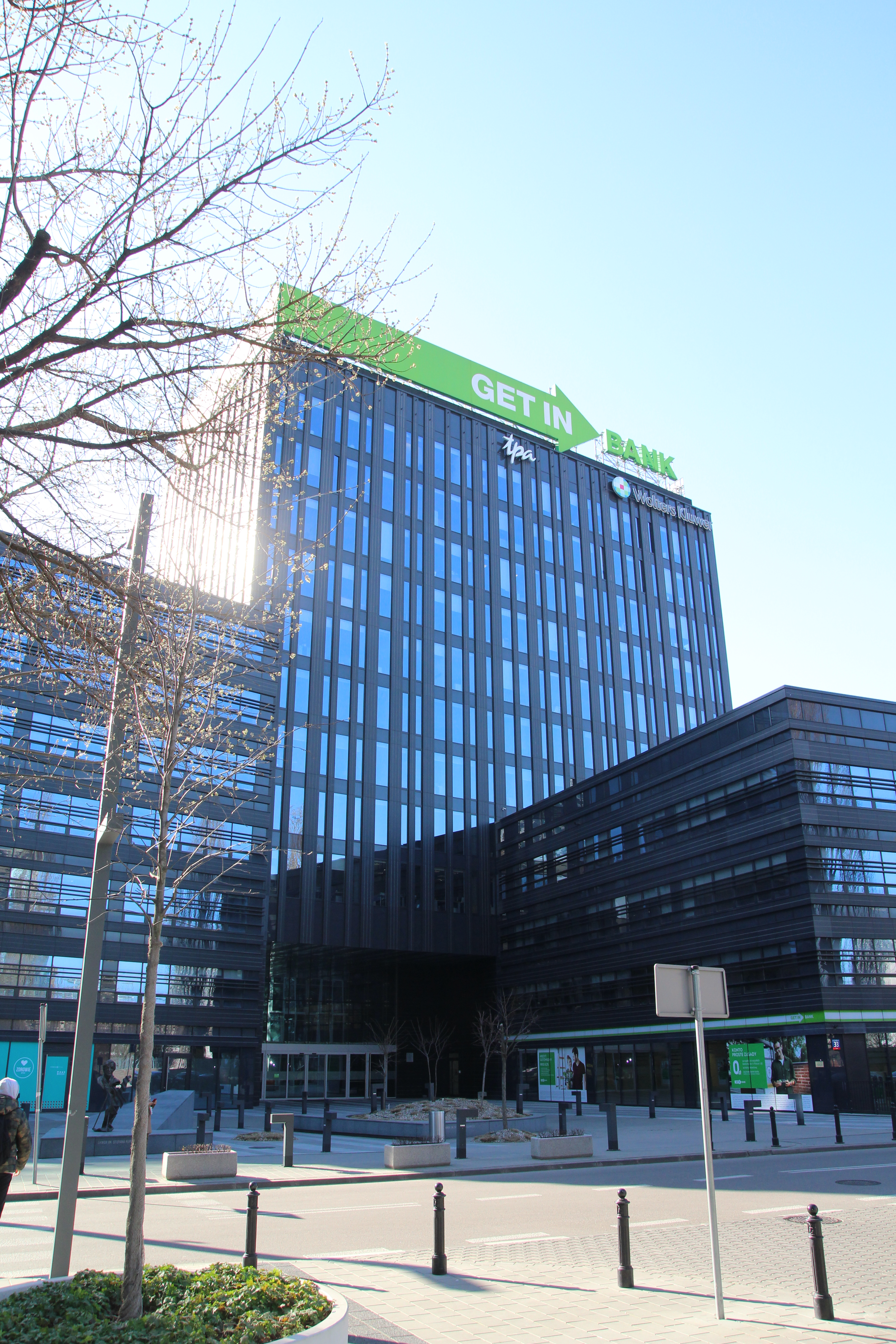
- Getin Bank in Warsaw
- Company type: Public limited company
- Industry: Financial services
- Products: Banking and insurance
- Parent: Getin Noble Bank SA
- Website: www.getinbank.pl

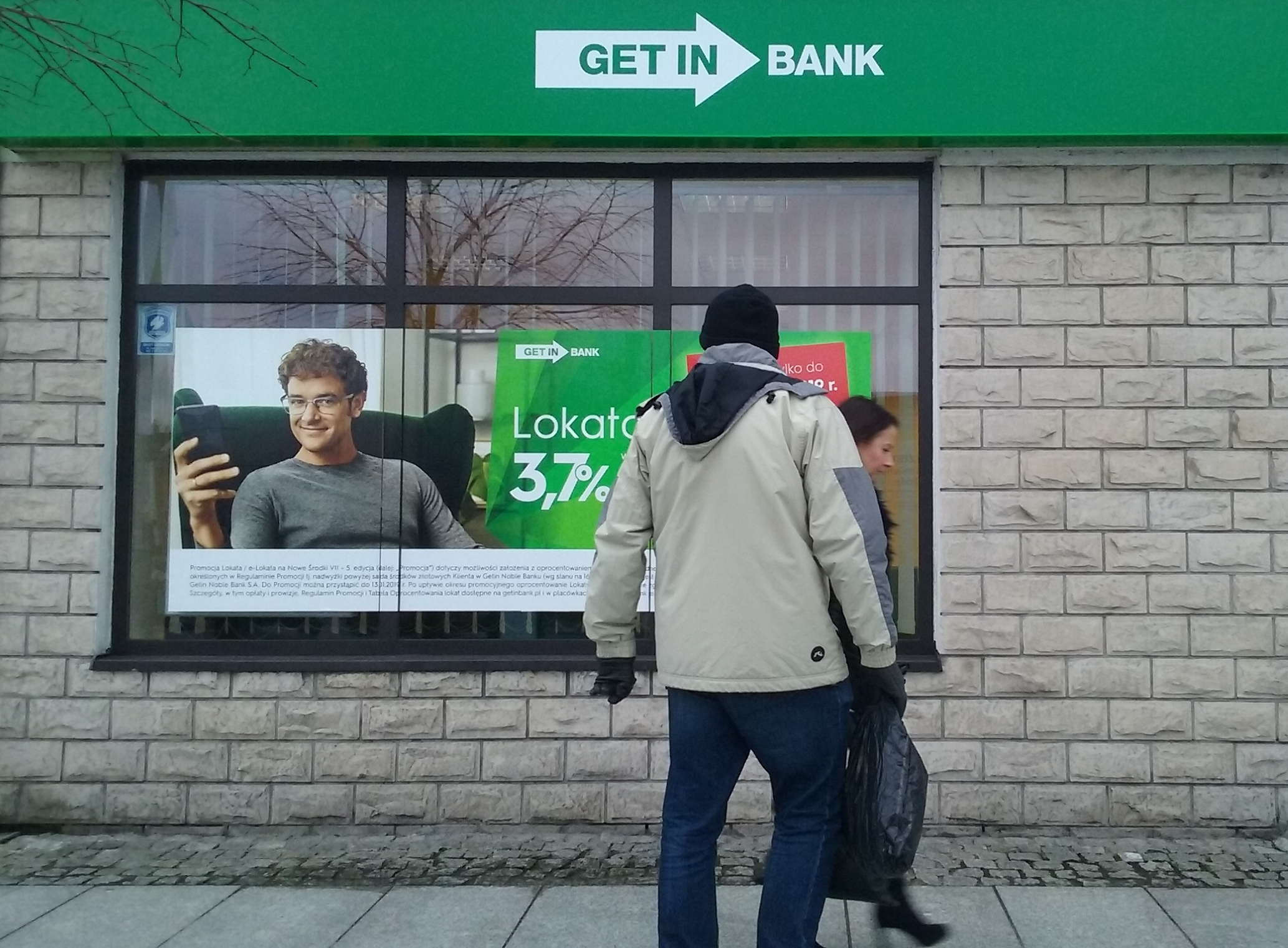
Getin Bank in Tomaszów Mazowiecki, Poland

Getin Bank was a bank in Poland, part of Noble Bank SA. It provided services to individual and business clients. The core business activity of Getin Bank was retail banking. The bank was used by about 2,4 million clients, its products were available at over 500 individual points and franchises, self use Getin Point and different localities. In 2022 the bank turned into Velo Bank.

== History ==
The bank began after deriving from Górnośląski Bank Gospodarczy SA, which began itself after the Decision no. 44 of the President of the National Bank of Poland on 3 October 1990. The first financial operations occurred on 2 January 1991 in a branch in Katowice. In the year of 1995, the bank gained a strategic investor, the Powszechny Bank Kredytowy (PBK). From 1 January 2002 to May 2004, GBG Bank functioned as part of the Capital Group of the Bank Przemysłowo-Handlowy. The actions from the Bank BPH Getin Holding bought on 25 May 2004.

On 24 September 2004, the bank changed branding to Getin Bank SA. Following this the Getin Bank SA had taken the Bank Przemysłowy in Łódź. In the year after, the Getin Holding finalised a purchase transaction of the Wschodni Bank Cukrownictwa. In March 2006 some of WBC's branches have been taken over by Getin Bank, while the license from the WBC Bank has been able to be used for the founding of the Noble Bank. In January 2010, Getin Bank joined Noble Bank to form the Getin Noble Bank SA.

== Controversies ==
Since joining the Noble Bank in August 2010 the Getin Noble Bank has been fined three times by the UOKiK for wrong practices against their clients and for falsehood. The last fine given by the UOKiK was for the way car insurance was being given. According to the UOKiK the agreements concluded that Getin Noble Bank had given imprecise agreements which allowed the bank to terminate the obligation to repay the loan immediately and in contravention to the signed legislation which did not inform the borrower about the total cost of all fees and commissions. The amount of the fine imposed by the UOKiK amounted to almost 6 million złoty.

== See also ==
- List of banks in Poland
