= Poles in Malta =

Poles in Malta Pollakki f'Malta
Total population
- 779 (2016)

Languages
- Polish, English and Maltese

Religion
- Roman Catholicism

Related ethnic groups
- Poles, Polish diaspora

Poles in Malta (Maltese: Pollakki f'Malta) are mostly expatriates from Poland living in Malta.

== Notable people ==
- Leszek Czarnecki (born 1962) – billionaire, engineer, doctor

== See also ==
- Polish diaspora
- Demographics of Malta
- Immigration to Malta
