= Sławomir Lachowski =

Polish economist and banker (born 1958)

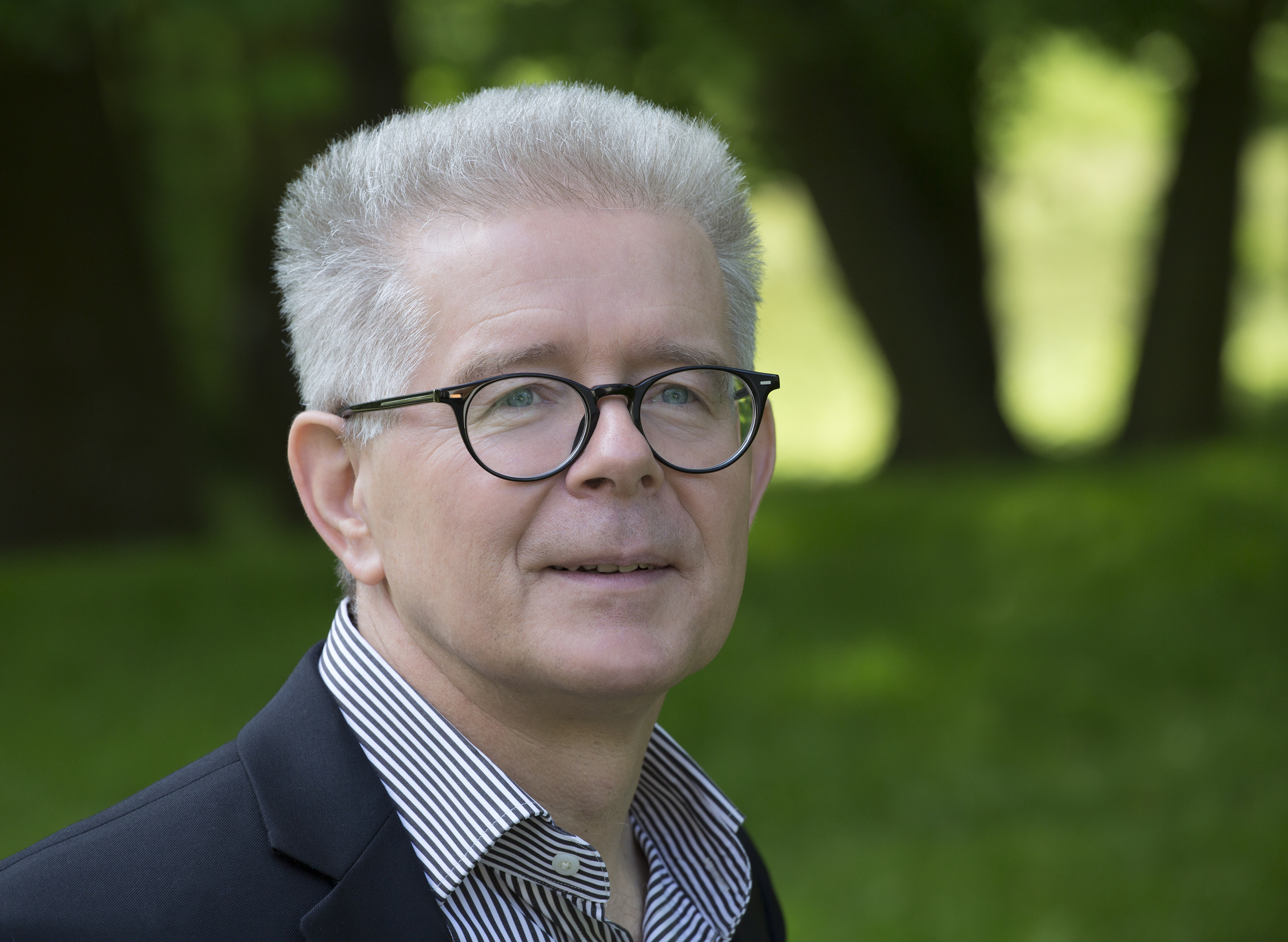
- Born: Sławomir Mieczysław Lachowski; 1 January 1958 (age 68); Końskie, Poland
- Occupations: Economist, banker
- Known for: Founding mBank
- Title: President of the Management Board of BRE Bank
- Term: 2004–2008
- Spouse: Marzena Lachowska
- Awards: Knight's Cross of the Order of Polonia Restituta (2005); Silver Cross of Merit (1996)

Sławomir Mieczysław Lachowski (born January 1, 1958, in Końskie) is a Polish economist and banking manager.

== Education ==
Lachowski graduated with distinction from the Foreign Trade faculty of the Central School of Planning and Statistics in Warsaw (now the Warsaw School of Economics). He also studied economics at the university of Johannes Gutenberg in Mainz (1980/1981 and 1988/1989) and the University of Zurich (1983 to 1984). He completed the Advanced Management Programme at INSEAD (1997) and the Stanford Executive Program (SEP) at Stanford University (2002).

== Career ==
In the years 1983–1990, he worked as an assistant and senior assistant at the Institute for Economic Development of the Warsaw School of Planning and Statistics, where he was involved in the work of a team led by Leszek Balcerowicz, dealing with the transformation of a centrally planned economy into a market economy.

From 1987 to 1992, he was the owner of the consulting company Intexim Centrum Analiz Ekonomicznych, specializing in economic and financial analysis of investment projects, strategic consulting, financial, operational, technical, and technological restructuring.

In January 1993, he began working at the Powszechny Bank Gospodarczy in Łódź, where he served as a member of the bank's management board responsible for restructuring the portfolio of bad debts and companies indebted to the bank. The bank implemented a recovery program, which included innovative financial restructuring methods, including the conversion of debt into shares of companies. This led to the establishment of the PBG Investment Fund, the first investment fund of its kind in Poland with a focus on restructuring.

From 1996 to 1998, he was the Vice President of the management board and later the First Deputy President of the management board of Bank Gospodarczy S.A. in Lodz, responsible for retail banking, corporate banking, and investments.

From 1998 to 2000, he served as Vice President of the management board of Powszechna Kasa Oszczędności BP, initially responsible for retail banking and later for all other business lines, including corporate banking, investment, and the housing market. During this time, he oversaw the restructuring of PKO BP and the development of a new growth strategy. In the first year of implementing the new strategy, the bank acquired nearly a million new retail customers.

In May 2000, Slawomir Lachowski began working at BRE Bank as a member of the management board, with a mission to build retail banking from scratch. As a result, on November 27, 2000, in less than six months, mBank, the first fully online bank in Poland and Central Eastern Europe, was launched. A year later, MultiBank was established, offering services to affluent individuals, entrepreneurs, and small businesses. mBank was the first fully virtual bank in the country. From 2004 to 2008, Slawomir Lachowski served as the President of the management board of BRE Bank, during which time the bank rose to become one of the three largest banks in Poland in terms of assets, with its market capitalization increasing tenfold. mBank subsequently successfully entered banking markets in the Czech Republic and Slovakia.^{[1]} Lachowski initiated the project of a European retail bank based on EU passport with international expansion of mBank to the Czech Republic and Slovakia in November 2007. Currently, mBank has over 1,000,000 customers in the Czech Republic and Slovakia, which have less than 15,000,000 inhabitants. In total, mBank today has over 5.5 million customers and is considered an example of the most successful organic growth in the Polish banking sector. Lachowski left BRE bank after a conflict with the main shareholder, Commerzbank, regarding his mBank expansion plans in Europe. BRE bank's shares fell by 9%, the value of BRE bank by over PLN 1 billion in one day when his departure was announced.

From 2013 to 2015, Lachowski served as the President of FM Bank PBP and oversaw the integration of FM Bank and Polski Bank Przedsiębiorczości. The merger required significant restructuring efforts and the development of a new growth strategy. The combined entity operated under the name BIZ Bank, focusing on serving micro-enterprises and self-employed professionals. During the same period, he also founded Bank Smart, a mobile digital bank based on the "mobile-first" concept, designed to be primarily accessible via smartphones.

In mid-2008, he founded the strategic consulting firm SL Consulting, which provided advisory services in Poland and abroad. He also served as a member of the supervisory boards of publicly traded companies, including Best S.A., Redan S.A., and Comp S.A. In 2016-2021 Lachowski was founder of G-Rock Limited. The firm obtained restricted licences in February 2019. It then proceeded to test its systems on a family and friends’ basis with the company's own funds, with no members of the public involved. The company failed to raise the required capital to roll out its product. This led to its directors relinquishing its limited licences, and as a result placed it into liquidation.

In 2019, he founded Fair Place Finance as a fintech specializing in developing innovative IT solutions for financial institutions. Since 2021, he has been the chairman of the supervisory board of Fair Place Finance S.A. The company has developed proprietary solutions for a transaction system to handle orders on the Warsaw Stock Exchange (GPW), which was certified by GPW and KDPW. Fair Place Finance have also created a transaction system that provides access to foreign exchanges and Multilateral Trading Facility (MTF) platforms, as well as a system for market data presentation and distribution, mobile applications, and a web application for brokerage and other investment services. Fair Place Finance has built its own technological platform for individual client investment offerings, which is offered as Software as a Service. The platform represents a unique solution based on the integration of investments and personal finances in one mobile application.

== Prizes and awards ==
Awards and Honors: 1996: Silver Cross of Merit 2005: Knight's Cross of the Order of Polonia Restituta 2005: Personality of the Polish Internet 2005 "Człowiek Polskiego Internetu" 2007: "Top Manager of the Year" in the finance and insurance category in a competition organized by Manager Magazine, the Polish Confederation of Private Employers Lewiatan, and KPMG.

== Private life ==
Lachowski is a marathon runner and mountaineer. He ran over 30 marathons, including the marathon in New York, Chicago, Berlin, and seven times the mBank marathon, which he created in Łódź, where the bank's headquarters is located. He has climbed Aconcagua, Ojos del Salado, Iztaccihuatl, Denali, Mt. Whitney, Elbrus, Mt. Vinson and Mont Blanc.

== Social activities and philanthropy ==
In 2008, Lachowski and his wife, Marzena Lachowska, founded Ex-Litteris Libertas, a charity devoted to creating equal opportunities for children from rural areas by supporting various educational and leisure activities.

== Publications ==
=== Books ===
“Acting on Values. Leadership in Turbulent Times” Kindle Edition, Studio Emka, 2015

“Od wartości do działania. Przywództwo w czasach przełomowych”, Studio Emka, Warszawa 2013

„DROGA ważniejsza niż cel. Wartości w życiu i biznesie”, Studio Emka, Warszawa, 2012

“It’s the Journey not the Destination. Values in Life and Business. Guide to Management by Values”, Kindle Edition, Studio Emka, 2012

“Disruptive Innovation in Banking: A Business Case in Low-Cost Finance. How to Win Against the Leaders by Creating Strategic Competitive Advantage and Real Value for Customers” Kindle Edition, Studio Emka, 2012

„Droga innowacji. Pracuj ciężko, baw się, zmieniaj świat”, Studio Emka, Warszawa, 2010

=== Articles ===
„Kryzys długiego dystansu.” ThinkTank Magazine, 2/2009
„Firma w firmie - kiedy tradycyjna firma musi szybko działać by wygrać.”, Harvard Business Review Polska, nr 7, 2003
„Praca w e-biznesie.” Sławomir Lachowski, Nina Georgiew. Zarządzanie Zasobami ludzkimi, nr 2, IPiSS, Warszawa, 2002
„Praca w e-biznesie.” Sławomir Lachowski, Nina Georgiew. Zarządzanie Zasobami ludzkimi, nr 2, IPiSS, Warszawa, 2002
„Prywatyzacja sektora bankowego jako czynnik wspomagający długofalowy wzrost gospodarczy (II)”, Bank i Kredyt, nr 9, 1998
„Prywatyzacja sektora bankowego jako czynnik wspomagający długofalowy wzrost gospodarczy (I)”, Bank i Kredyt, nr 7-8, 1998
„Procesy konsolidacji sektora bankowego. Niezwykłe przyspieszenie.” Bank. nr 1, 1998
„Kierunki rozwoju polskiego systemu bankowego.” Bank. nr 12, 1997
„Proces prywatyzacji banków w Polsce – sukcesy i porażki.” Bank i Kredyt, nr 11, 1997
“System finansowy w Polsce – stan obecny i perspektywy rozwoju.”, CASE, Raporty CASE, nr 8, 1997
„The Process of Privatising Banks in Poland: Successes and Failures of a Multitrac Path.”, OECD Advisory Group on Privatisation, Eleventh Plenary Session: Banks and Privatisation, Rome, 1997
„Wpływ regulacji podatkowych na wybór ścieżki restrukturyzacji złego długu.” Bank i Kredyt, nr 1-2, 1996
„Restrukturyzacja portfela kredytów trudnych banku komercyjnego w okresie transformacji. Studium przypadku: Powszechny Bank Gospodarczy SA w Łodzi.”, Bank i Kredyt, nr 5,1995
“Restructuring of a Bad Debt Portfolio in a Commercial Bank in the Midst of an Economic Transition Period. Case Study: Powszechny Bank Gospadarczy w Łodzi.”, CASE Studies&Analyses, nr 57, 1995
