= Bank Depozytowo-Kredytowy =

Former Polish bank

- Type: State-owned enterprise
- Industry: Financial services
- Predecessor: National Bank of Poland
- Founded: 1988
- Defunct: 1999
- Fate: Merged
- Successor: Bank Pekao
- Headquarters: Lublin, Poland
- Area served: Poland
- Products: Banking services
- Owner: Government of Poland

Bank Depozytowo-Kredytowy (lit. 'Deposit and Credit Bank') was a bank based in Lublin, Poland. It was established in 1988-1989, and absorbed in 1999 by Bank Pekao.

== History ==
Bank BDK was one of nine banks spun off in the late 1980s from the National Bank of Poland, the culmination of a sequence of reforms during the 1980s that brought an end to the country's single-tier banking system.

On 8 October 1991, Bank BDK was transformed into a joint-stock company, fully owned by the Polish State Treasury. By the mid-1990s it was one of the two smallest of the nine regional banks separated from the NBP, together with Pomorski Bank Kredytowy (Bank PBKS) in Szczecin.

In 1996, a government decision brought together Polska Kasa Opieki with Bank BDK and two of its peers established in 1989, Bank PBKS and the much larger Bank PBG in Łódź. On 1 January 1999, the four banks were merged into Bank Polska Kasa Opieki SA, or Bank Pekao.

== See also ==
- List of banks in Poland
