= Getin Holding =

Financial holding company

- Company type: Public limited company
- Industry: Financial services
- Founded: 1996
- Founder: Leszek Czarnecki
- Headquarters: Warsaw, Poland
- Key people: Piotr Kaczmarek
- Products: Banking and insurance
- Website: www.getin.pl

Getin Holding S.A. is a financial holding company formed in Warsaw in 1996. Getin started its activities as an electronic business center, becoming the leader in the information technology sector for small and medium-sized businesses in Poland, providing IT, CRM and ERP solutions for Polish companies. The company's main shareholder is a Polish billionaire Leszek Czarnecki.

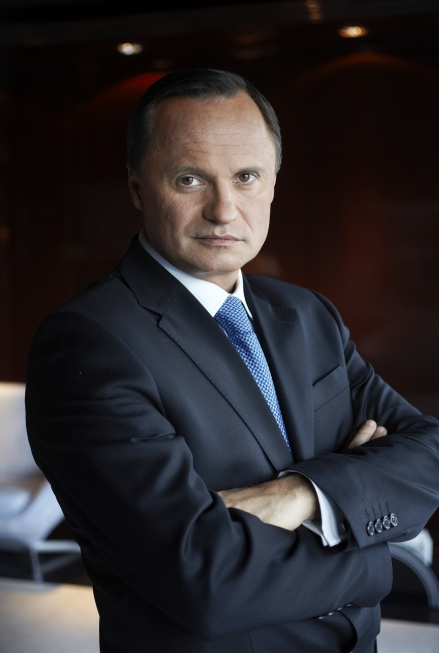
Leszek Czarnecki

Getin Holding invests in banks, insurance, leasing and brokerage companies. Holding includes Idea Bank (with divisions in Poland, Romania, Ukraine, Belarus and formerly Russia), Getin Leasing, Noble Bank, Open Finance, Powszechny Dom Kredytowy, Fiolet TU Europa, Noble Funds, Carcade Leasing (Russia, Ukraine, Poland, Belarus).

== Structure ==
- Getin Noble Bank (7,41%)
  - Noble Bank
  - Getin Bank
  - Open Finance
  - Noble Funds TFI
  - Noble Securities
  - Getin Leasing
  - Noble Concierge
- Idea Bank
  - Idea Bank (Russia) 2011—2015
  - Idea Bank (Belarus)
  - Idea Bank (Ukraine)
  - Idea Bank (Romania)
  - Idea Leasing
- MW Trade
- Carcade
