= Powszechny Bank Kredytowy =

Former Polish bank

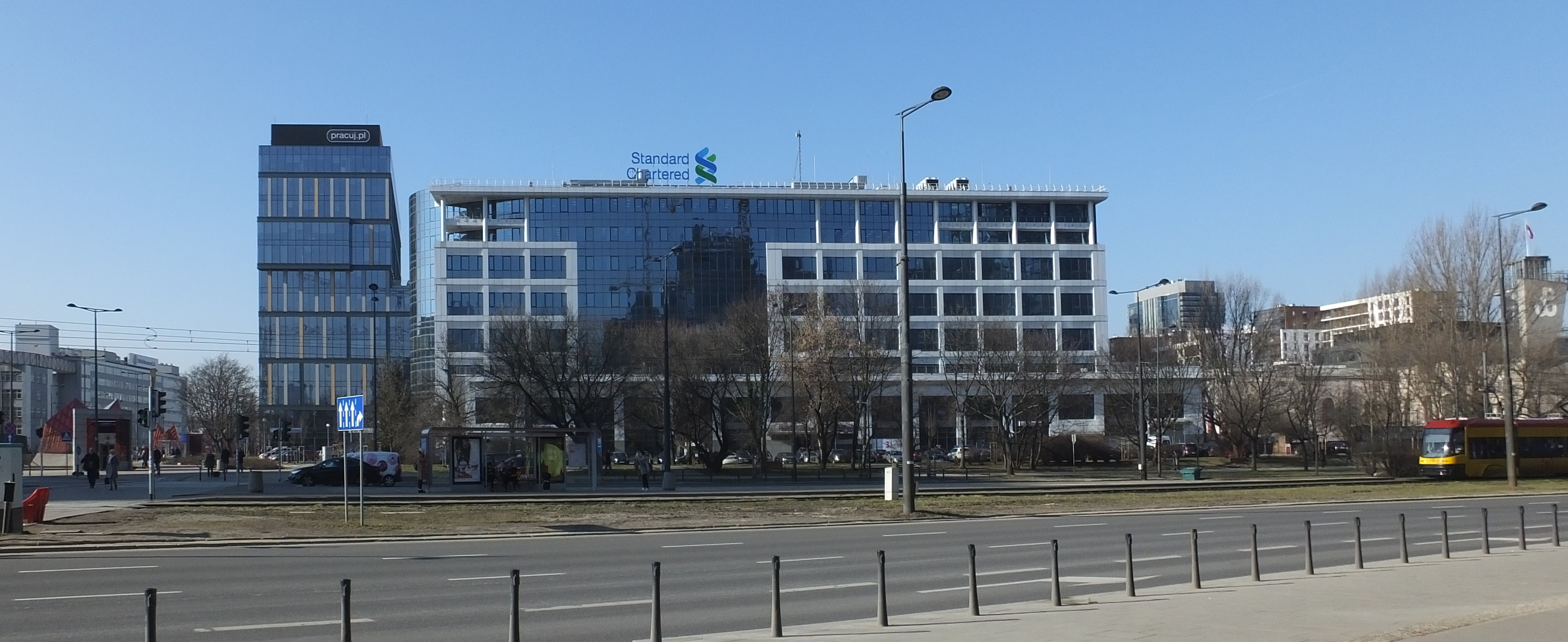
- Former headquarters in Warsaw
- Trade name: Bank PBK
- Type: State-owned enterprise
- Industry: Financial services
- Predecessor: National Bank of Poland
- Founded: April 1988
- Defunct: 2001
- Fate: Merged
- Successor: Bank BPH-PBK
- Headquarters: Warsaw, Poland
- Area served: Poland
- Products: Banking services
- Owner: Polish State Treasury

Powszechny Bank Kredytowy (lit. 'General Credit Bank'), also known as Bank PBK, was a Polish bank based in Warsaw. It was established in 1988-1989 by spinoff from the National Bank of Poland, and was eventually merged in 2001 with Bank BPH to form Bank BPH-PBK.

== History ==
Bank PBK was one of nine regional banks spun off from the National Bank of Poland, the culmination of a sequence of reforms during the 1980s that brought an end to the country's single-tier banking system.

It was legally established in April 1988 and started operations on 1 January 1989. Its first president was Ewa Kawecka-Włodarczak. Its name evoked a former affiliate of Vienna's Länderbank, also named Powszechny Bank Kredytowy (German: Allgemeine Kreditbank), which had been establish in 1910 in Austrian Galicia and relocated from there to Warsaw in 1926.

On 8 October 1991, Bank PBK was transformed into a joint-stock company, fully owned by the Polish State Treasury. By the mid-1990s it was the seven-largest Polish bank overall behind PKO Bank Polski, Bank Pekao, Bank Handlowy, Bank BGŻ, Bank PBG, and Bank Śląski. In 1995, Vienna-based Creditanstalt acquired 13 percent of Bank PBK's shares in a partial privatization process. Also in 1995, Bank PBK took a 54.4-percent stake in Górnośląski Bank Gospodarczy (Bank GBG). In 1997, it absorbed operations from the troubled Bank Morski, and in 1998, from Pierwszy Komercyjny Bank w Lublinie.

The ownership stake of Creditanstalt, by then controlled by Bank Austria, in Bank PBK increased to reach 57 percent in 2000. In June of that year, Bank Austria-Creditanstalt announced that it would merge its own Polish subsidiary into Bank PBK. In 2001, Bank Austria had itself come under the control of Munich-based HypoVereinsbank (HVB) which decided to merge Bank PBK with its own Polish subsidiary Bank BPH to form Bank Przemysłowo-Handlowy PBK. The merged entity, also known as Bank BPH-PBK, was the third-largest bank in Poland by assets at the time.

== See also ==
- List of banks in Poland
