= Pomorski Bank Kredytowy =

Former Polish bank

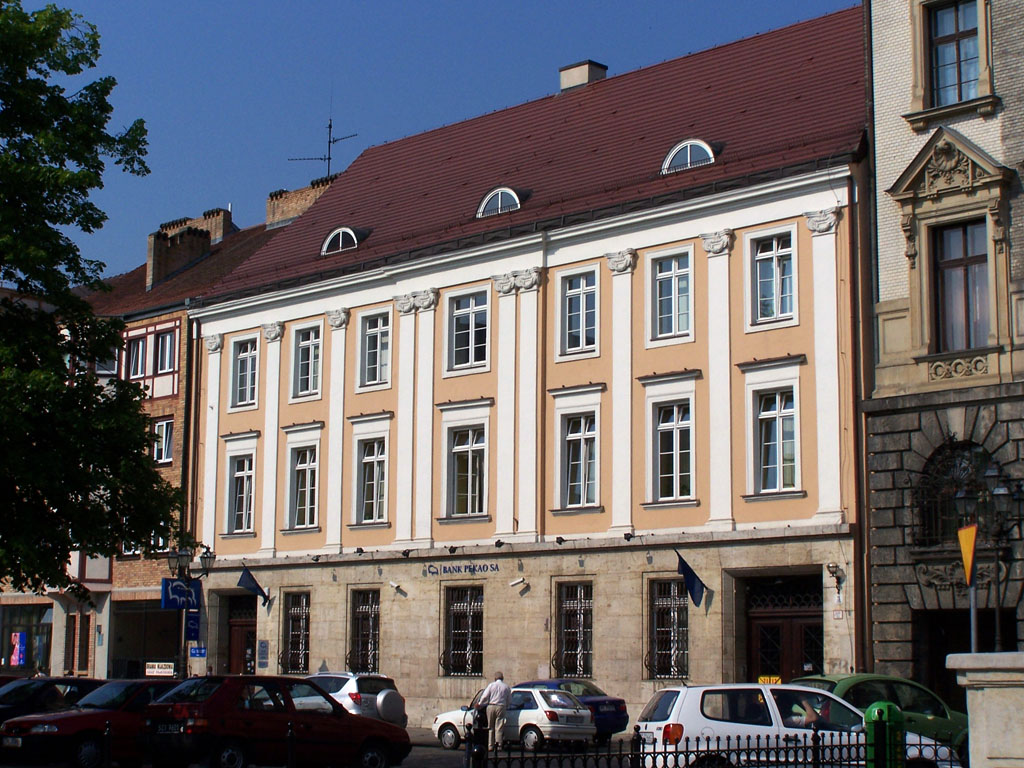
- Ionic Palace in Szczecin the former headquarters of Bank PBKS
- Type: State-owned enterprise
- Industry: Financial services
- Predecessor: National Bank of Poland
- Founded: 1989
- Defunct: 1999
- Fate: Merged
- Successor: Bank Pekao
- Headquarters: Szczecin, Poland
- Area served: Poland
- Products: Banking services
- Owner: Government of Poland

Pomorski Bank Kredytowy (lit. 'Pomeranian Credit Bank'), also known as Bank PBKS, was a Polish bank based in Szczecin. It was established in 1988-1989, and absorbed in 1999 by Bank Pekao.

== History ==
Bank PBKS was one of nine banks spun off in the late 1980s from the National Bank of Poland, the culmination of a sequence of reforms during the 1980s that brought an end to the country's single-tier banking system.

On 8 October 1991, Bank PBKS was transformed into a joint-stock company, fully owned by the Polish State Treasury. By the mid-1990s it was one of the two smallest of the nine regional banks separated from the NBP, together with Bank Depozytowo-Kredytowy (Bank BDK) in Lublin.

In 1996, a government decision brought together Polska Kasa Opieki with Bank PBKS and two of its peers established in 1989, Bank BDK and the much larger Bank PBG in Łódź. On 1 January 1999, the four banks were merged into Bank Polska Kasa Opieki SA, or Bank Pekao.

== See also ==
- List of banks in Poland
