= Leszek Czarnecki =

Polish billionaire

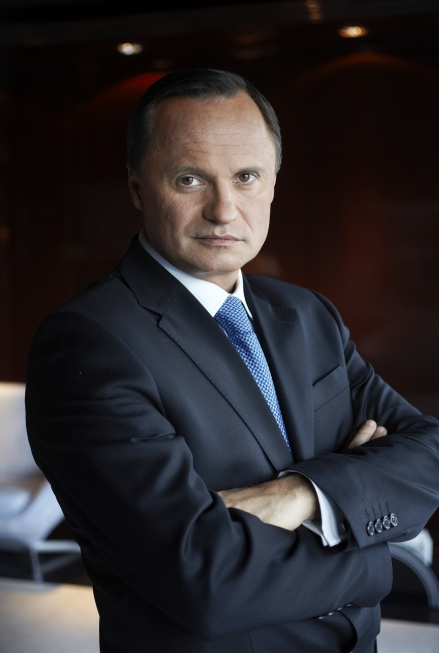
- Born: 9 May 1962 (age 64); Wrocław, Poland
- Occupation: businessman
- Known for: billionaire
- Spouse(s): Married, 2 children

Leszek Janusz Czarnecki (born 9 May 1962 in Wrocław) is a Polish billionaire. His main business activity is banking. He is an engineer by education and a doctor of economics. Graduate of Harvard Business School (AMP). Since 2006 he lives in Malta.

== Background ==
He graduated from Wrocław University of Technology, Faculty of Sanitary Engineering; gained a doctorate in economics at Wrocław University of Economics, graduated from the AMP programme at Harvard Business School.

He is the main shareholder in five companies listed on the Warsaw Stock Exchange – Getin Holding, Getin Noble Bank, Idea Bank, MW Trade, and Open Finance.

In 1986, his passion for cave diving led him to set up a commercial diving company – Przedsiębiorstwo Hydrotechniki i Inżynierii TAN. He was the creator and main shareholder of Europejski Fundusz Leasingowy (European Leasing Fund) which he set up in 1991. This was the first and, eventually, the largest lease company in Poland. In 2001, he sold it to the French bank Credit Agricole for PLN 900 million, and became the CEO of Credit Agricole Poland. At that time, he was also managing other group's companies, such as EFL, Lukas Bank, TU Europa, TU na Życie Europa, and Getin Service Provider S.A.

In 1993–1995, he was the deputy Chairman of the Supervisory Board, and later the CEO of Polbank S.A. (GMAC Bank). In 1996-1997, Leszek Czarnecki was the Chairman of the Supervisory Board of an insurance company based in Wrocław TU Europa na Życie S.A, and in 1997 he became the CEO of TU Europa S.A. and TU Europa na Życie S.A. for the next two years.

In 2002-2003, he was the CEO and managing director responsible for leasing and insurance at Credit Agricole Poland. Until the end of November 2004, he was the CEO of Getin Holding, and until May 2006 CEO of Getin Bank.

Since June 2007, he has been the Chairman of Getin Holding's Supervisory Board and a member of the Supervisory Boards of other companies belonging to the Getin Holding Group. Since the merger of Getin Bank with Noble Bank (January 2010), he has been the Chairman of the Supervisory Board of Getin Noble Bank. In 2006 he purchased Poltegor Centre for €17.5 million, built in the mid-1970s in the city centre of Wrocław, and at that time the city's tallest building. In place of the demolished building, Czarnecki, along with the investor LC Corp, built Sky Tower.

== The main shareholder and/or cofounder of the following companies ==
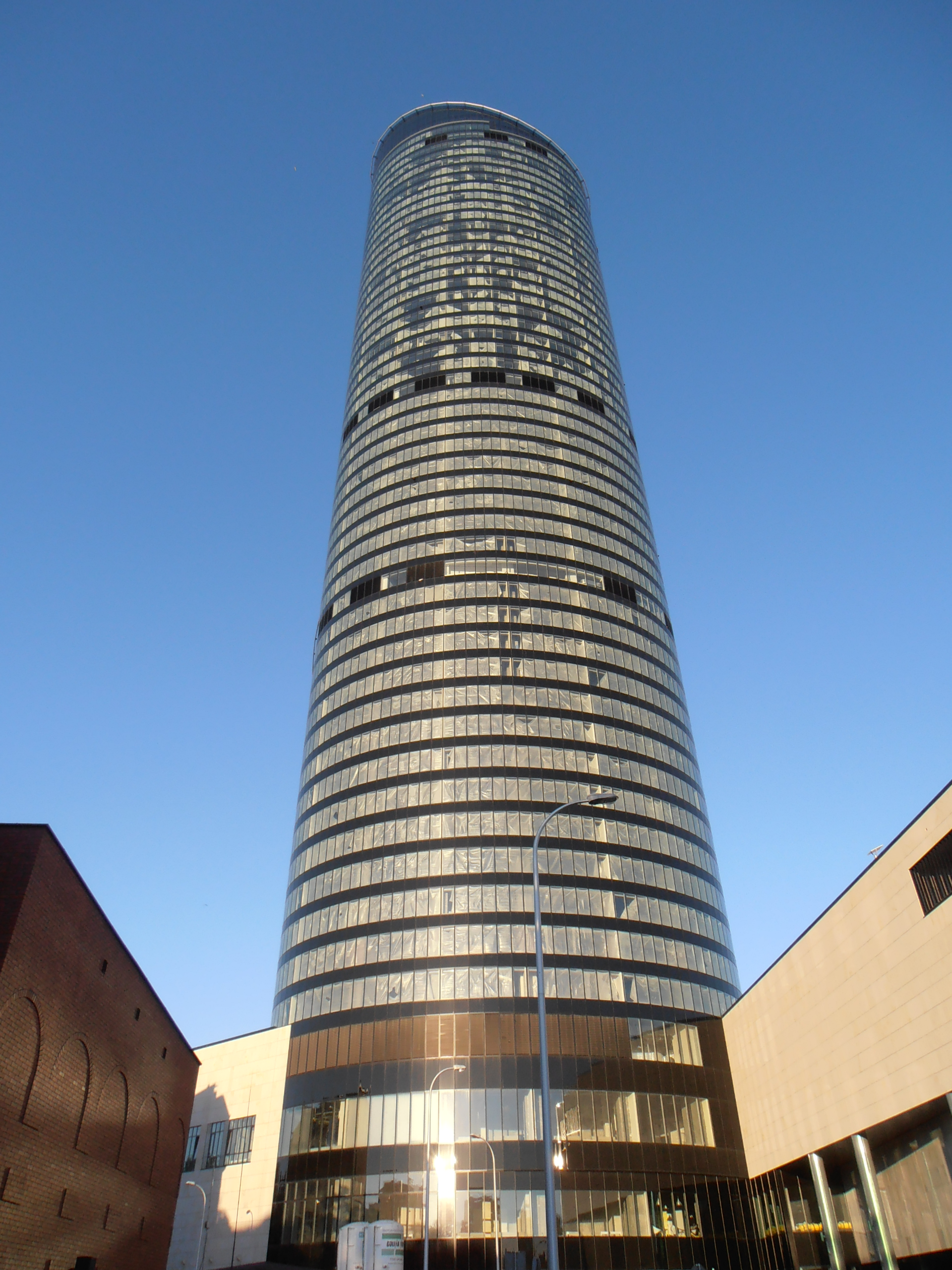
Sky Tower, the tallest building in Wrocław was built by LC Corp controlled by Czarnecki.

Banks

- Getin Noble Bank (Getin Bank + Noble Bank merged in 2010)
- Idea Bank (and Lion's Bank – private banking division)
- Idea Bank Ukraine
- Idea Bank Belarus
- Idea Bank Romania (former Romanian International Bank)
- Idea Bank Russia (sold in 2015)

Insurance

- Open Life (49%)

TU Europa (sold to Talanx in 2011)

Leasing

- Idea Getin Leasing (Idea Leasing and Getin Leasing merged in 2018)
- Carcade (Russia)
- European Leasing Fund (IPO in 2001, sold to Credit Agricole in 2002)

Financial brokerage

- Open Finance
- Home Broker
- Tax Care
- Idea Expert

Real estate

- LC Corp (IPO in 2007, sold in 2017)

Other companies

- TAN (sold in 1991)
- Noble Funds
- Noble Securities
- MW Trade
- getBack (sold in 2016)

== Publications ==
He is the author of five books:

- Simply Business (2011)
- Risk in Banking: A Post-Crisis Perspective (2011)
- Simply Business. Next step (2012)
- Firm DNA Model (2015)
- Alfa leadership (2018)

== Honours ==
In 1998, Leszek Czarnecki was granted the Wall Street Journal award for the Best CEO in Central Europe, as one of the 10 renowned businessmen in the region. In the same year, he also won the global finals of the Young Business Achiever, a contest that is held in Beijing.

In April 2004, celebrating the 25th anniversary of its presence in the European market, the Financial Times recognised Leszek Czarnecki as one of the 25 emerging stars of European business to set up the directions for the development of financial markets. Leszek Czarnecki was the only Pole included in the FT list.

In October 2004, Leszek Czarnecki joined the honorary members of the Polish Association of Lease Companies, and in November he was included in the group of four individuals recognised as Entrepreneur of the Year from Eastern Europe by INSEAD, one of the best business universities in Europe, and the French Minister of Finance. In September 2005, he received the prestigious Lesław Paga award honouring his achievements and personal contribution to the development of the financial services market in Poland.

Leszek Czarnecki was elected as the Player of the Year by the Polish Edition of Forbes magazine three years in a row – in 2005, 2006, and 2007.

In November 2009, Leszek Czarnecki was recognised in the Entrepreneur of the Year contest organised by Ernst & Young and received an honorary award for employing new staff in times of deep economic crisis. The same month, Puls Biznesu nominated him for the title of the Entrepreneur of the Twenty-Year Independence Period.

In March 2010, Gazeta Finansowa awarded him the title of the Financier of the Year 2009. May 2010 saw Leszek Czarnecki receive from PKPP Lewiatan the Andrzej Wierzbicki Award for his success in business and active contribution to the business environment.

Leszek Czarnecki was awarded the honourable medal by the Polish Insurance Association for the longstanding cooperation and support of the Association.

In 2010, he ranked number 721 on the list of the world's billionaires, with his worth assessed at US$1.4 billion. In 2008, Forbes magazine ranked him in the 446th position on the list of the world's billionaires, with assets valued at $2.6 billion, the first among those Poles listed. Before, in 2006, Forbes placed him 793th on the list, with property assessed at $1 billion.

In 2010, he won the Entrepreneur of the Year title in the opinion poll organised by the Polish Employers Organisation and Puls Biznesu. In 2011, he was recognised as the Business Leader of the Year by the Warsaw Business Journal.

In 2013, he was awarded the special award of the Warsaw Stock Exchange for his passionate and determined creation of new economic projects and visionary leadership in business in the public market.

In 2014, Leszek Czarnecki was recognised by the editorial team of the WSE magazine GG Parkiet as the man of the capital market on the 25th anniversary of the democratic changes in Poland.

== Public relations ==
He invested in St. Antony's College Oxford Noble Foundation established in October 2012 inaugurating the Contemporary Polish Studies Programme at Oxford University in the United Kingdom. The Oxford Programme's founders and affiliates are Timothy Garton Ash, Norman Davies, Margaret MacMillan.

Leszek Czarnecki established the charity foundation of Jolanta and Leszek Czarneccy, previously called LC Heart, in 2007. So far, he has transferred PLN 55 million to the foundation.

== Family ==
Two children from a previous marriage. Since 2008, married to Jolanta Pieńkowska. He holds a pilot's licence.

== Diving ==
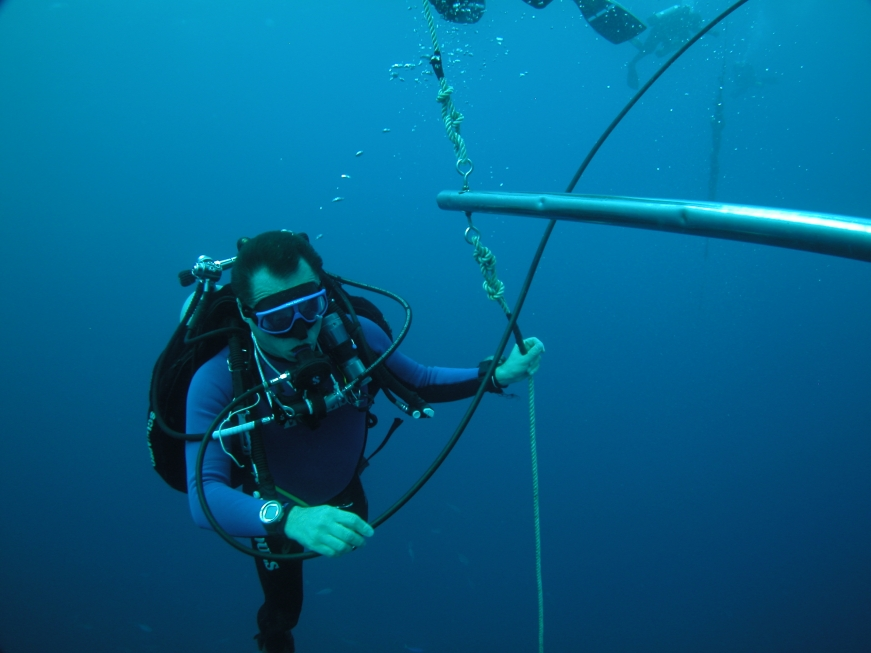
Leszek Czarnecki on Bikini Atoll 2006

Polish and world record holder in diving:

Getting his licence at the age of 22, in the early 1980s, Leszek Czarnecki was one of the youngest diving instructors in Poland. In 1986, his passion for cave diving led him to set up his first commercial diving company —Przedsiębiorstwo Techniki Alpinistyczno-Nurkowej TAN S.A. In 1986–1990, he worked as a professional diver (with heavy diving equipment for underwater works). Diving is still his passion. He holds two – Polish and world – records. In September 2003, he beat the Polish record diving to 194 m in Boesmansgat cave in South Africa. The decompression lasted 4 hours and 48 minutes, at a water temperature of 16 °C. He was assisted by Nuno Gomes who holds two deep sea diving records – in the open sea he dived to 318.25 metres, and in caves – to 283 metres. In Mexico, Leszek Czarnecki beat the world record in the longest distance covered in the caverns – 17 km in the system of water-filled caves Dos Ojos on the Yucatán Peninsula in Mexico. In 2006, he took part in a North Pole expedition, and in a Bikini Atoll expedition to explore the wrecks. In 2007, he went on a trip across Siberian wilderness with diving in Lake Baikal, in 2008 – he went to Antarctica, and in 2010 – explored wrecks in the Truck Lagoon in Micronesia (where he dived several times), and in Galapagos.
