= Bank BPH =

Former Polish bank

Bank BPH, for Bank Przemysłowo-Handlowy (lit. 'Industrial and Commercial Bank') was a bank based in Kraków, Poland. Established in 1988-1989 by spinoff from the National Bank of Poland, it merged in 2001 with Bank PBK to form Bank Przemysłowo-Handlowy PBK, also known as Bank BPH-PBK. Bank BPH-PBK in turn was dismantled in the later 2000s, with much of its operations taken over by Bank Pekao in 2007. The rest, renamed Bank BPH and sometimes colloquially referred to as mini-BPH, was folded into GE Money Bank in 2009, then acquired by Alior Bank in 2016.

== Bank BPH ==
Bank BPH logo under HVB ownership

Bank BPH was one of nine banks spun off in the late 1980s from the National Bank of Poland, the culmination of a sequence of reforms during the 1980s that brought an end to the country's single-tier banking system.

On 8 October 1991, Bank BPH was transformed into a joint-stock company, fully owned by the Polish State Treasury. By the mid-1990s it was the fourth-largest of the nine regional banks spun off from the NBP, behind Bank PBG in Łódź, Bank Śląski in Katowice, and Bank PBK in Warsaw. It was listed in 1995, successfully thanks to the investment of the European Bank for Reconstruction and Development (EBRD) which acquired a 15.06 percent stake; other core investors included Bank Śląski (4.79 percent), the ING branch in Warsaw (5.31 percent), Daiwa Europe (4.57 percent), and Wielkopolski Bank Kredytowy (2.48 percent). In 1999, a majority stake in Bank BPH was acquired by Munich-based HypoVereinsbank (HVB).

Bank BPH was led by Janusz Quandt from 1989 until his dismissal in 1995, then by Henryka Pieronkiewicz from 1995 to 1999.

== Bank BPH-PBK ==
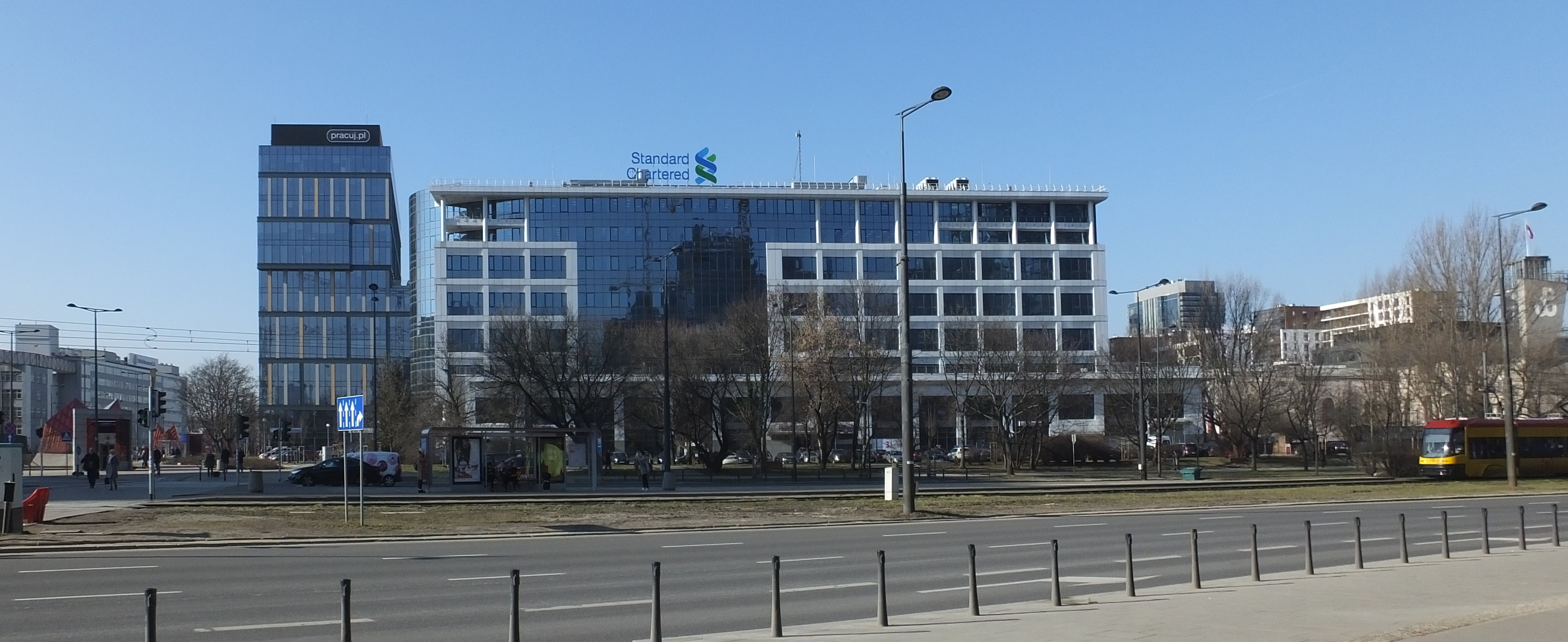
Former head office of Bank BPH-PBK in Warsaw

In the early 2000s, HVB took control of Bank Austria and thus indirectly of its Polish affiliate Bank PBK. In 2001, HVB decided to merge Bank BPH and Bank PBK to form Bank Przemysłowo-Handlowy PBK, or Bank BPH-PBK. The merged Bank BPH-PBK had dual headquarters in Kraków and Warsaw. It was the third-largest bank in Poland by assets at the time. Following the transaction's completion, HVB held 71.2 percent of the merged entity's shares, the Polish Treasury held 3.7 percent, and the remaining shares remained in free float.

In November 2005, HVB was acquired by UniCredit, which was also majority-owner of Bank Pekao. Despite the European Commission's approval of the transaction, the Polish Treasury Ministry had reservations concerning the potential competition implications of merging what were at the time Poland's second- and third-largest banks. Furthermore, in the privatization agreement for Bank Pekao SA in 2000, UniCredit had committed to refrain from purchasing a competing bank in Poland until 2009. The Polish government, under pressure from the European Commission, eventually approved the merger in April 2006, albeit with restrictive conditions.

As a result, only 285 of BPH-PBK's ca. 485 branches were incorporated into Bank Pekao SA in 2007, together with the mortgage subsidiary HypoVereinsbank Bank Hipoteczny, whereas the remaining 200 branches were separated and earmarked for sale by UniCredit to another bank. In August 2007, UniCredit and General Electric, through its subsidiary GE Money, announced an agreement to sell Bank BPH-PBK, and in 2008 the Polish Commission for Banking Supervision approved the transaction. GE Money Bank took over 89 percent of the still-listed entity's shares and on 31 December 2009, the rump Bank BPH-PBK eventually merged with GE Money Bank Poland, with the merged entity known as Bank BPH, sometimes colloquially referred to as "mini-BPH".

== "Mini-BPH" ==
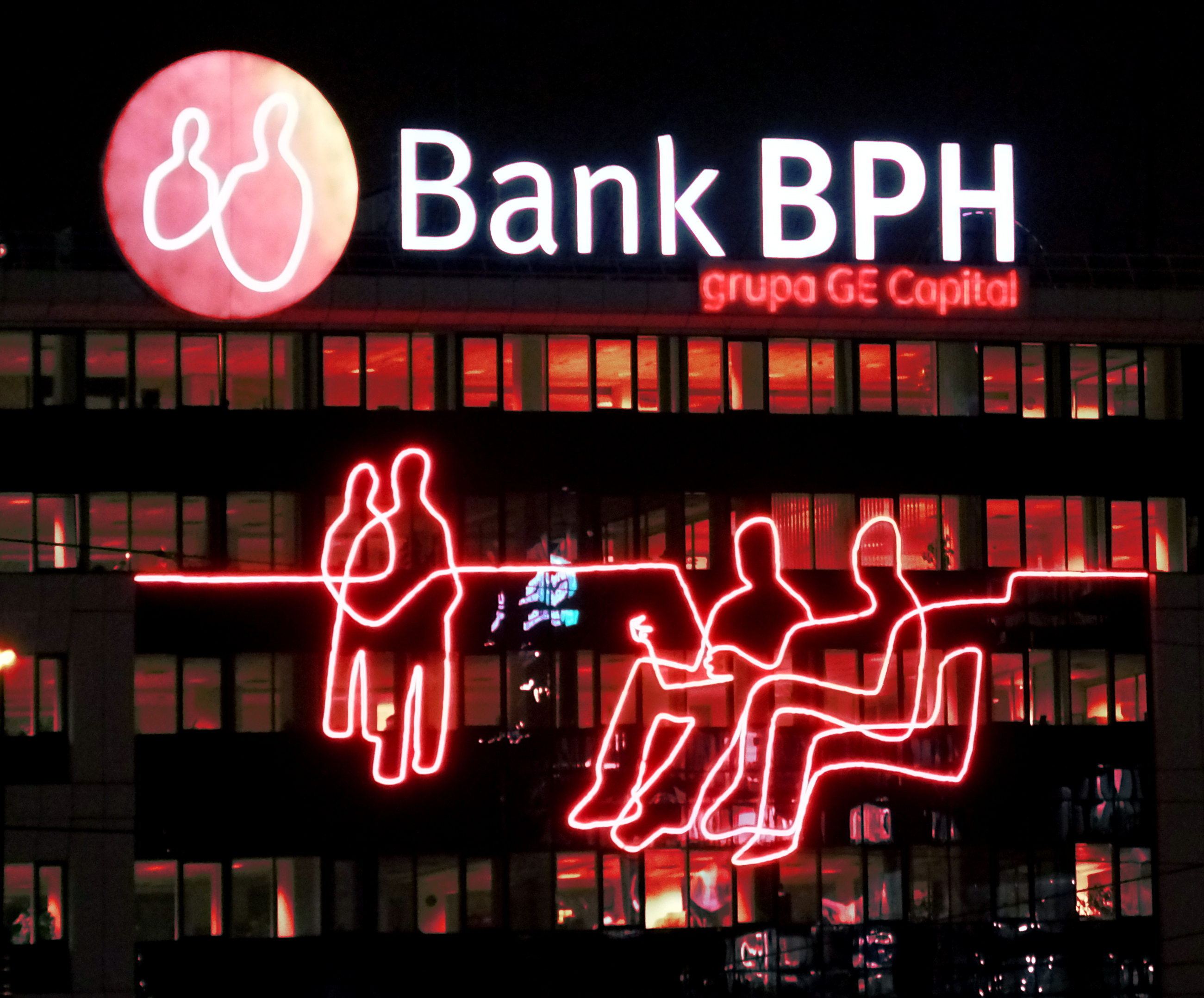
BPH visual identity under GE ownership

In May 2010, the management board and supervisory board adopted a new strategy for Bank BPH and the owner began negotiations on collective redundancies, which were to cover over 1,500 employees by the end of 2011. In 2014, the bank's headquarters were moved from Krakow and Warsaw to Gdańsk, and in October of that year, GE revealed it was considering selling its majority stake. In 2015, another transformation plan was announced, which assumed the layoff of approximately one-third of the bank's employees. As a result of the transformation, 53 flagship branches remained in the bank's branch network, while the rest was closed or converted to partner branches.

In April 2016, Alior Bank purchased a spun-off part of Bank BPH's operations. The mortgage loan portfolio and BPH Investment Fund Company SA were excluded from the transaction. In November 2016, upon entry in the National Court Register, the spun-off part of Bank BPH SA was legally merged with Alior Bank SA. In December 2016, Bank BPH was delisted from the Warsaw Stock Exchange. It continued operations solely within the scope of servicing existing products.

In 2017, the sale of BPH Towarzystwo Funduszy Inwestycyjnych SA (BPH TFI) to Altus TFI was announced. BPH TFI's operations later continued under the Rockbridge Towarzystwo Funduszy Inwestycyjnych brand. In 2020, the last company from the Bank BPH capital group, BPH PBK Zarządzanie Funduszami sp. z o. o. was liquidated.

== See also ==
- List of banks in Poland
