= Sky Tower (Wrocław) =

Skyscraper in Wrocław, Poland

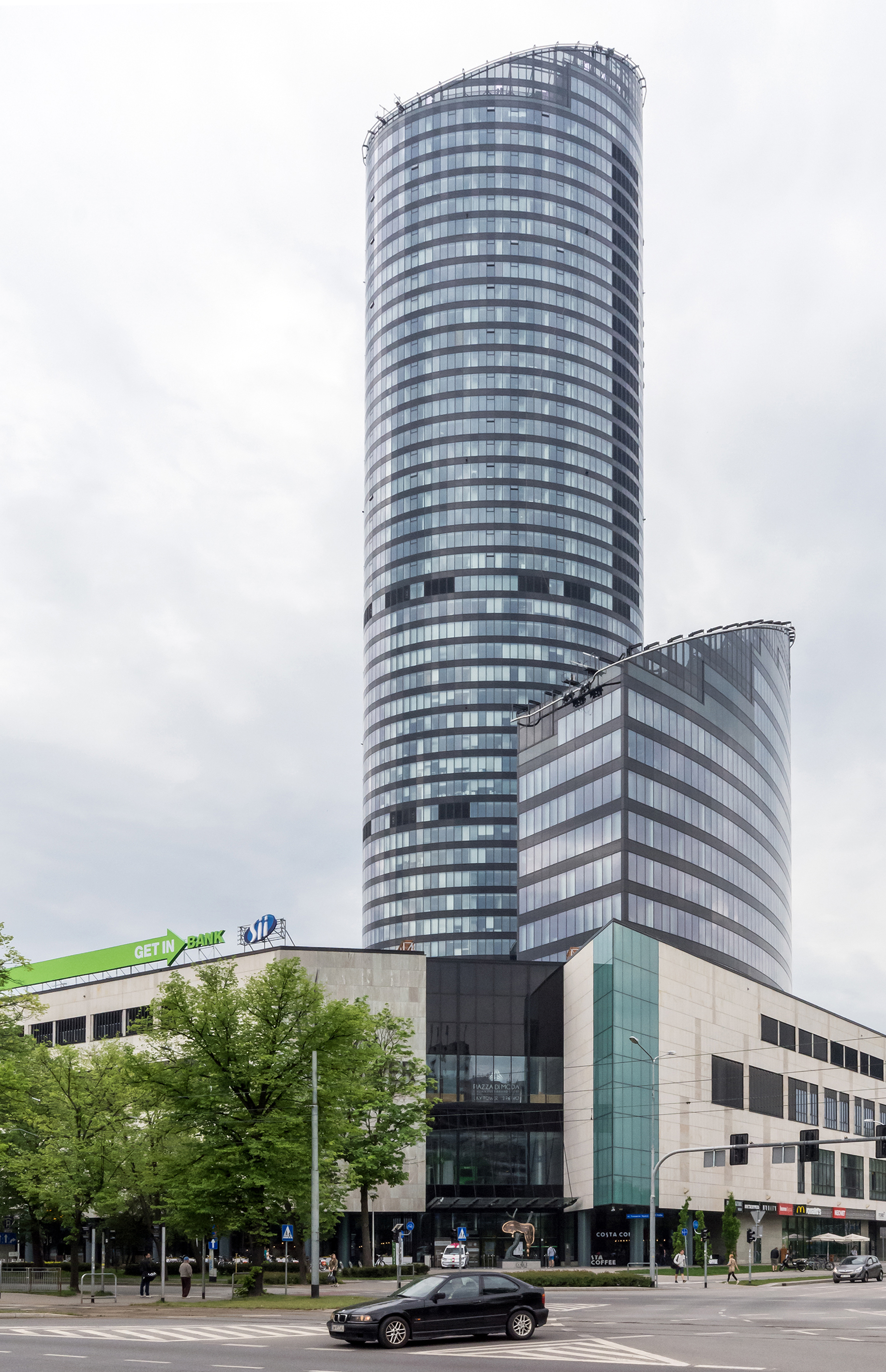
- Sky Tower in 2015
- Interactive map of the Sky Tower area

General information
- Status: Completed
- Type: Mixed use
- Location: Wrocław, Poland
- Coordinates: 51°5′38″N 17°1′3″E
- Construction started: December 2007
- Topped-out: September 2011
- Completed: 2012
- Opening: 24 May 2012
- Cost: US$400 million

Height
- Antenna spire: 212 m (696 ft)
- Roof: 206 m (676 ft)

Technical details
- Floor count: 51

Design and construction
- Architects: Mariusz Korszorsz and Dariusz Dziubiński (Studio Architektoniczne FOLD s.c.)
- Main contractor: LC Corp.

Website
- skytower.pl

Sky Tower is a skyscraper in Wrocław, Poland. At 212 metres (696 ft) and featuring 51 floors, it is the tallest building in Wrocław and was also the tallest building in Poland in the category of height to roof until Varso Tower overtook it in 2022. Construction began in 2007 and was completed in 2012.

== Overview ==
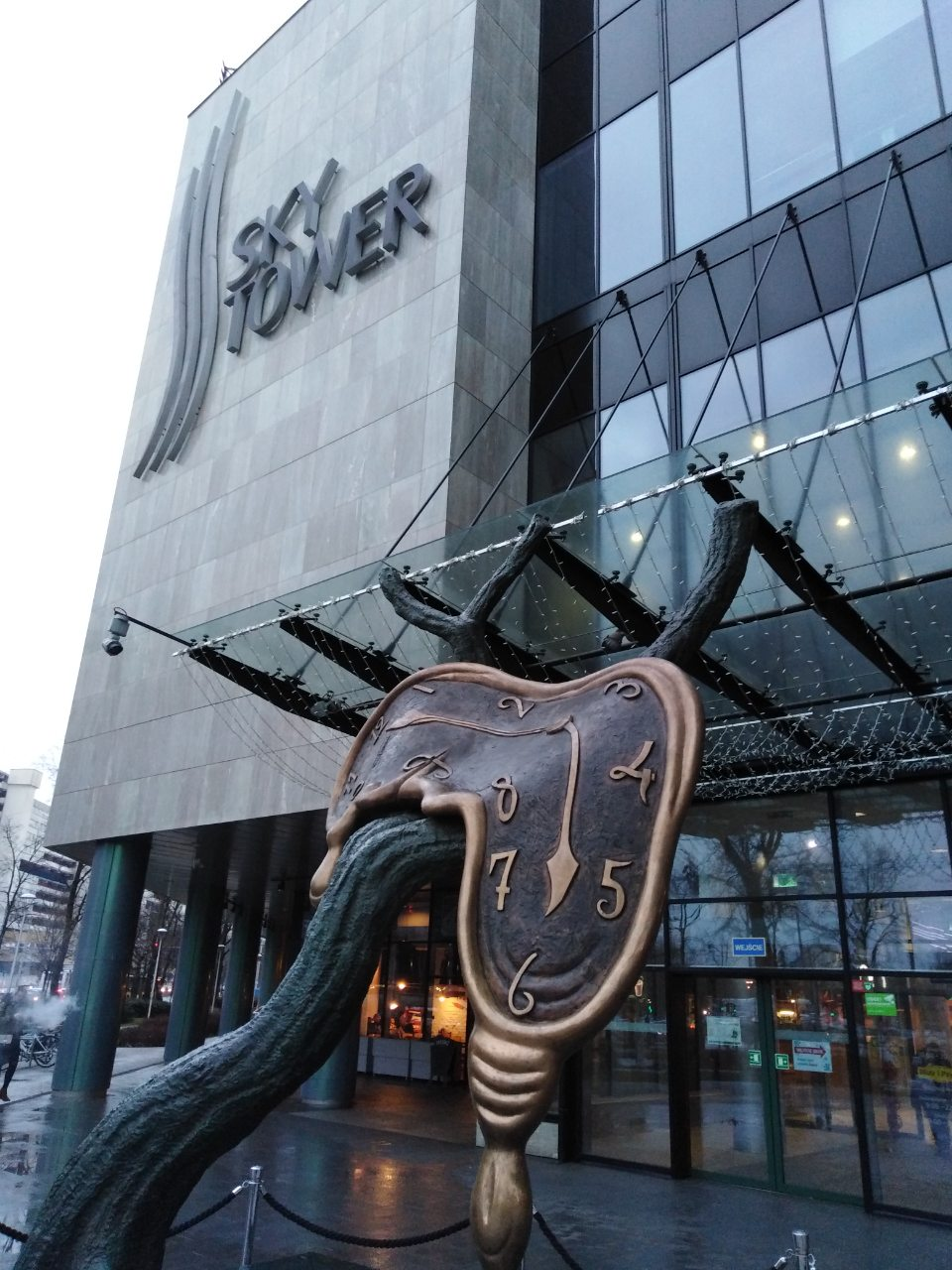
The Profile of Time sculpture by Salvador Dalí in front of the Sky Tower

The project is located on a property with an area of 27,362 square metres (294,520 sq ft) in the south of the centre of Wrocław, approximately 2.5 kilometres (1.6 mi) from the Main Market Square. The plot was previously occupied by the 24-storey Poltegor Centre, which before its demolition was the tallest building in the city at 92 metres (302 ft) in height.

The 51-storey Sky Tower rises 212 metres (696 ft), with a roof height of 206 metres (676 ft). It features office space on the lower levels and 184 apartments on the 28th to 48th floors. A publicly accessible observation deck is located on the 49th floor. Opened on 3 January 2014, it is the highest observation deck in Poland.

Accompanying the skyscraper are two other buildings: a four-storey low-rise featuring a shopping mall, and a 19-storey building with a cascading sail design, containing offices and 52 apartments on floors 11–18.

== History ==
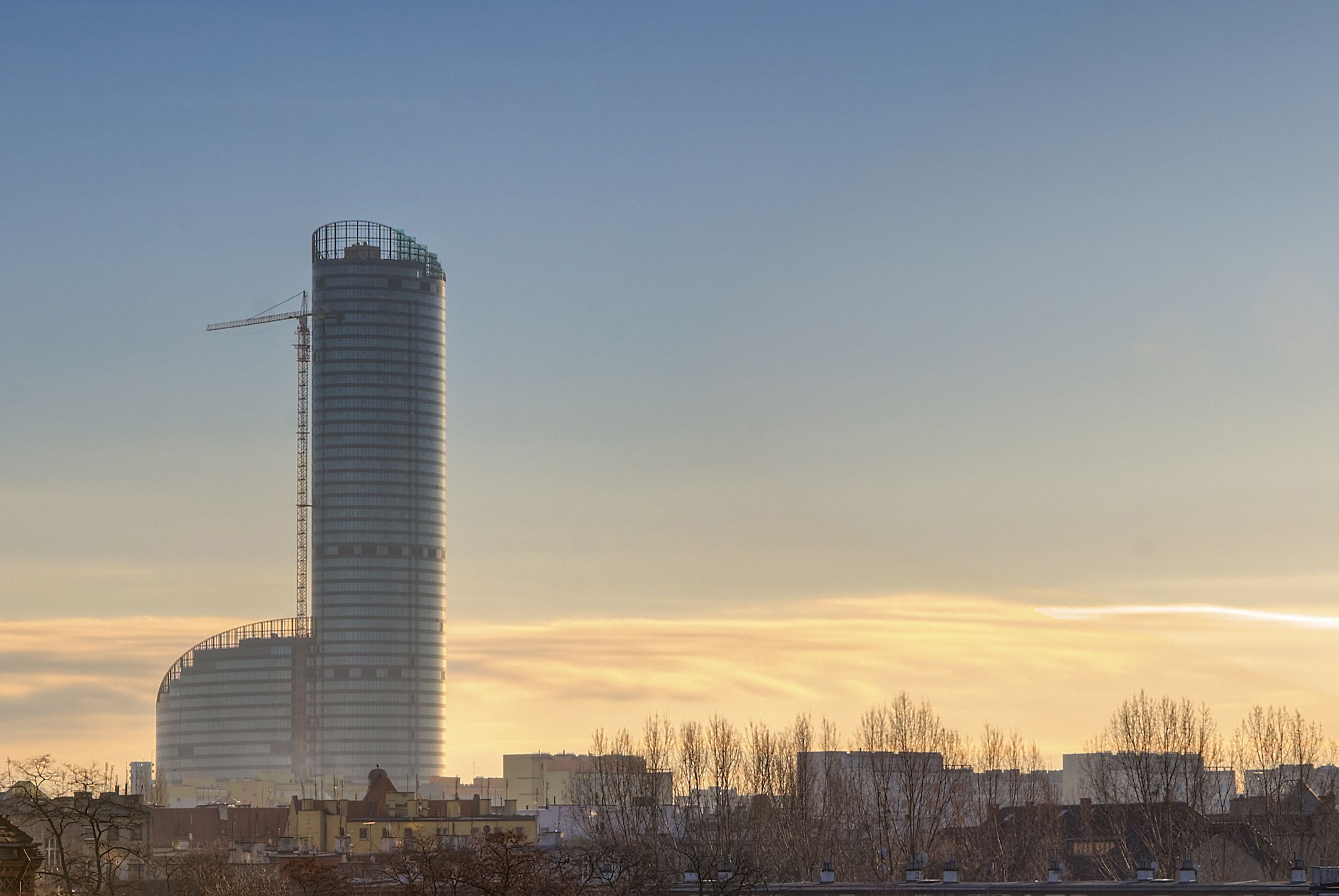
Sky Tower under construction, January 2012

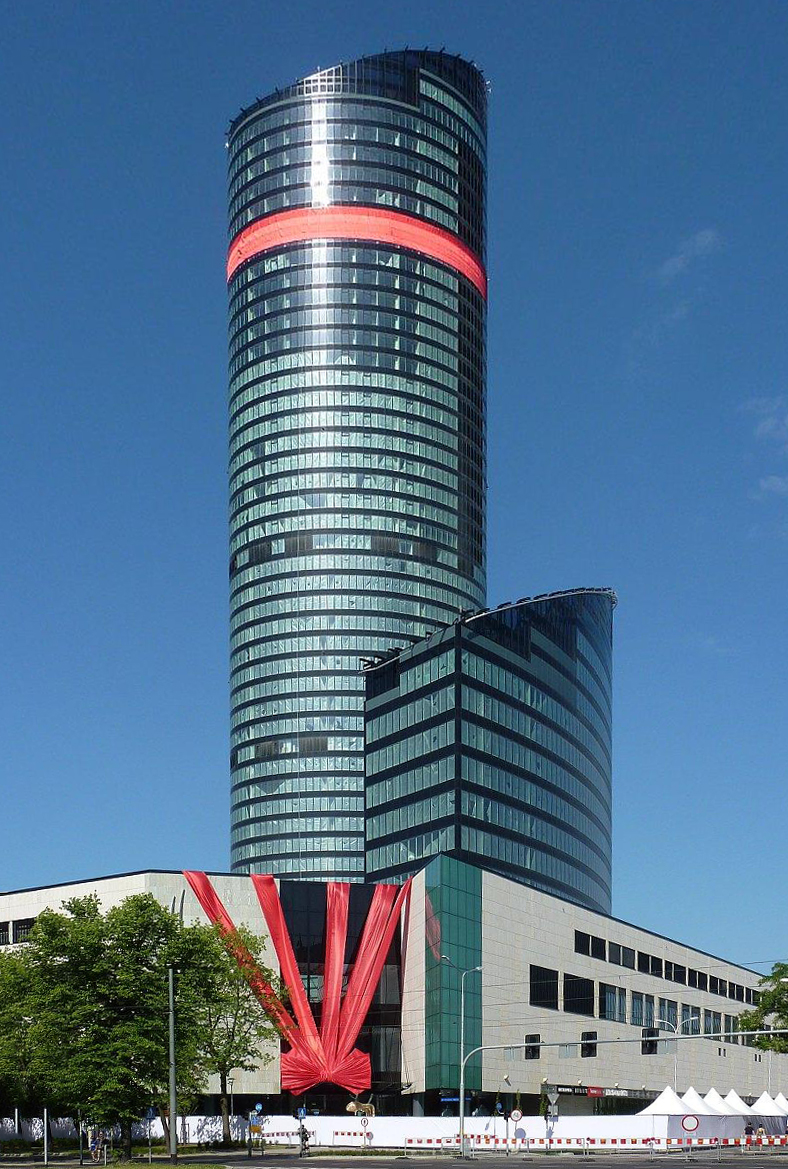
Sky Tower the day before its opening, 23 May 2012

The building permit was obtained by the investor on 10 August 2007, with the foundation works starting on 6 December 2007.

According to the initial architectural plans, Sky Tower would be a residential, office and commercial complex consisting of seven buildings of various heights and with an aggregate surface area exceeding 260,000 square metres (2,800,000 sq ft). One of the apartment buildings comprising Sky Tower was to be 258 metres (846 ft) in height, including a spire (roof height at 221 metres (725 ft)) and thus be the tallest residential building in Poland. The complex was to contain a parking facility with a capacity of over 2,000 cars. Completion of the Sky Tower project was originally slated for the second half of 2010.

Like many construction sites around the world, Sky Tower was affected by the 2008 economic crisis. On 3 November 2008, the developer of the complex, LC Corp, sold the project to its main shareholder Leszek Czarnecki (shareholder Getin Holding SA), one of the richest individuals in Poland, who suspended construction for six months due to uncertain market conditions of the investment. In mid-December 2008, it was announced that the complex would be redesigned. In June 2009, after a half-year break, the construction was resumed and until the end of October the building was built according to the old design, as the investor had not yet made a final decision as to the height of the skyscraper. In November 2009, the investor announced a new design for the project.

The tower was topped-out in September 2011 and completed in early 2012. On 24 April 2012, the sculpture Profile of Time by Spanish artist Salvador Dalí was installed in front of the Sky Tower, on permanent loan from the Dalí Museum in Paris.

The opening of the complex was held on 24 May 2012.

== See also ==
- List of tallest buildings in Poland
