= Poltegor Centre =

Coordinates: 51°5′38.33″N 17°1′11.73″E

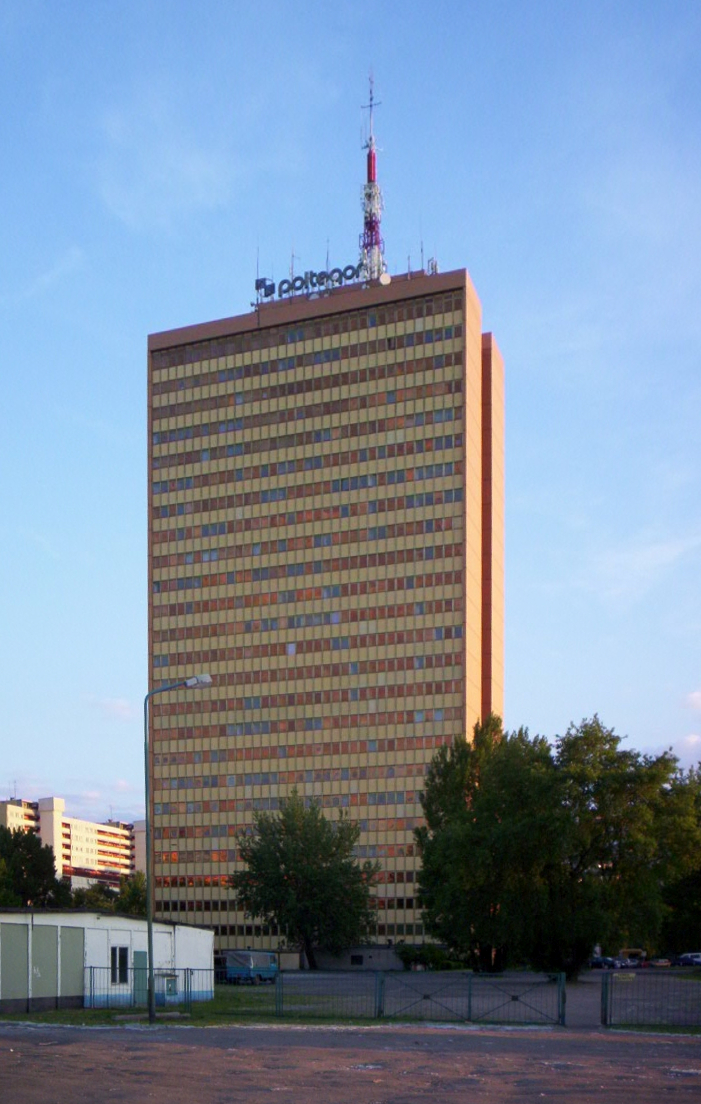
Poltegor Centre

Poltegor Centre (formerly Poltegor) was the highest building in Wrocław. It was built in 1982 and the name originates from a mining company called Poltegor (an acronym for Polska Technika Górnicza, "Polish Mining Technics"). During the 1980s, the building was the company's headquarters, and even after that period they still occupied a fair part of the building. The building was demolished in 2007.

The technology behind the building was a central ferroconcrete core, around which each floor was built. Because the floors were built using a mould, all of them were of exactly the same size and form. The core itself housed elevator shafts, staircases, and emergency and maintenance shafts.

The total height was 125 metres, but the actual height to the roof was 92 metres. It consisted of 25 floors and one underground floor. The underground floor was accessed via three cargo elevators (out of the total number of 9 installed), as the floor was used only by the building's staff. The next level was the main hall of the building, from where one took an elevator. The next 22 floors were rented as office space, and the last floor was a conference hall and a sightseeing platform. On the roof there was an antenna mounted; it was used by various radio and TV broadcasters. From here, for example, the first post-Soviet, independent TV (Prywatna Telewizja "Echo") was broadcast. The antenna's last users were regional broadcasters like Radio Aplauz, Tok FM, Radiostacja, RMF Classic, and Telewizja Dolnośląska TeDe.

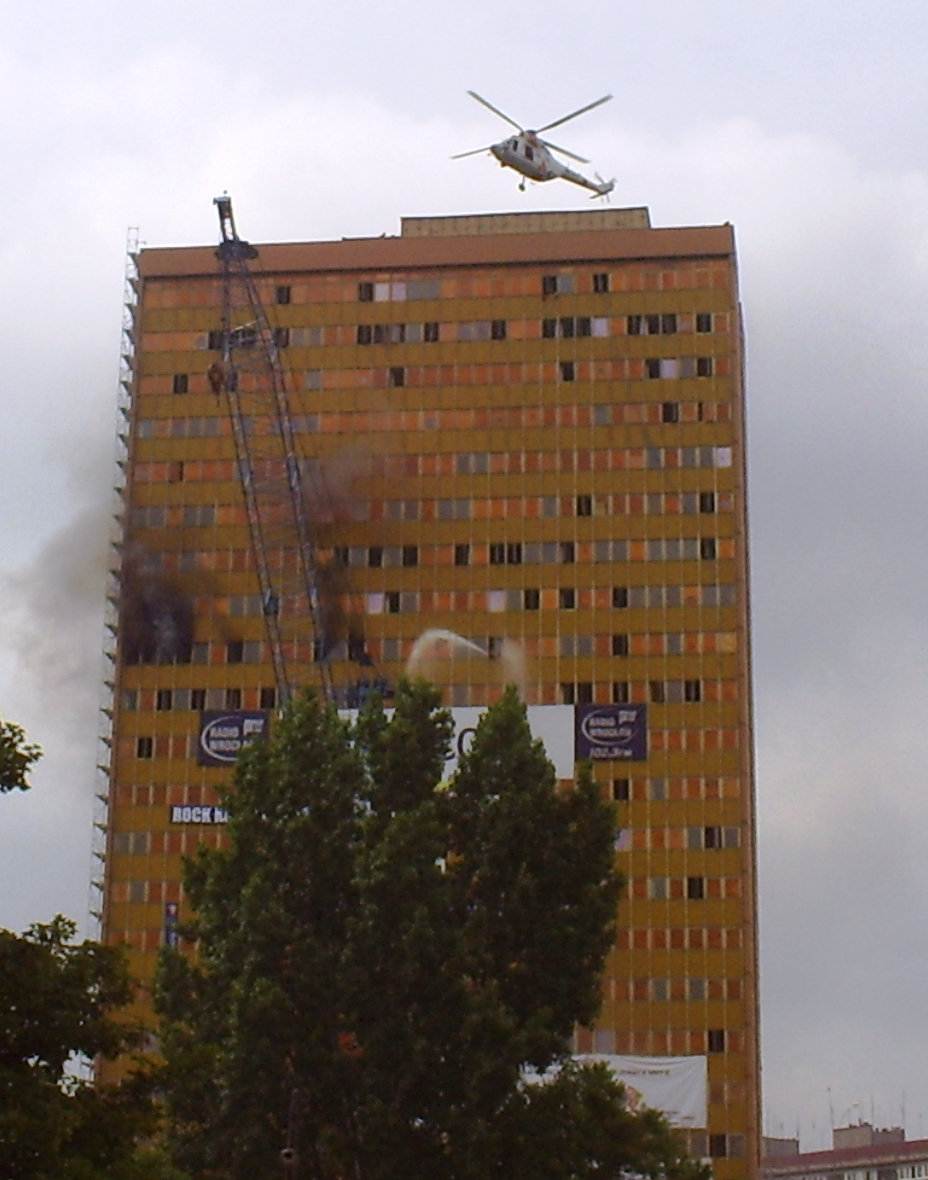
Rescue exercises. Life-saving with burning building.

On January 18, 2007, Poltegor Centre (along with the surrounding land) was bought by a local businessman, Leszek Czarnecki. Czarnecki decided to demolish the building, which was done on June 2, 2007. In its place, the Sky Tower was built, a 212-metre-tall apartment building, which was completed in 2012.
