= Getin Noble Bank =

Polish banking and financial services company

- Company type: Spółka Akcyjna
- Founded: 2010
- Headquarters: ul. Przyokopowa 33, 01-208, Warsaw, Poland
- Key people: Artur Klimczak
- Products: Financial services
- Website: https://gnbbank.pl/

Getin Noble Bank is a Polish banking and financial services company.

== History ==
It was formed in Warsaw in 2010 as a result of the merger of Getin Bank SA with Noble Bank SA. Main shareholder is a Polish billionaire Leszek Czarnecki.

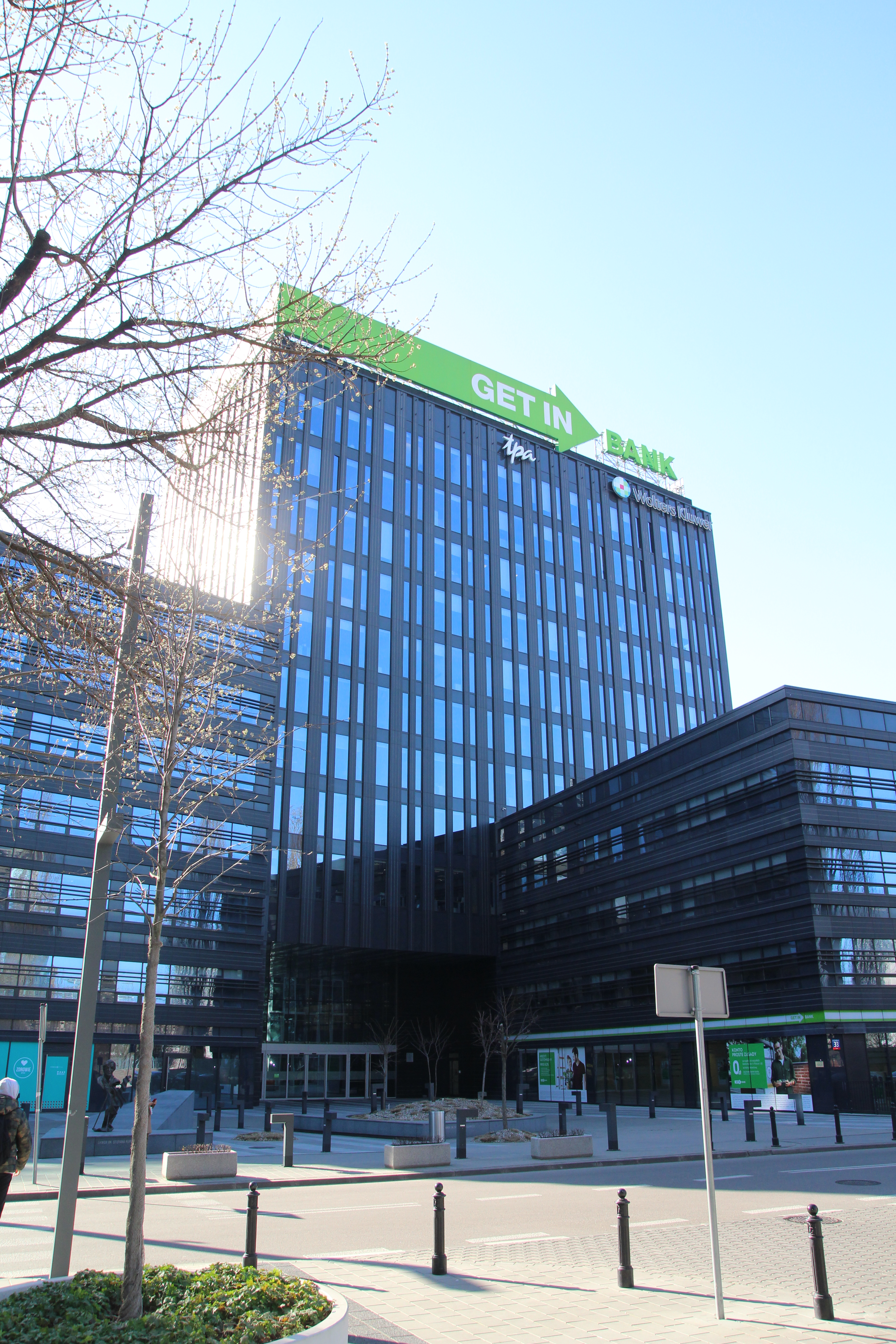
Getin Noble in Warsaw

Listed on the Warsaw Stock Exchange. It is the 6th largest bank in Poland in terms of the value of assets, and 13th in terms of the number of branches. It offers its clients retail and commercial financing services, investment banking services, asset management, and private banking services.

In April 2023, the Getin Noble Bank was undergoing bankruptcy proceedings. Its founder Leszek Czarnecki has blamed the country's ruling PiS party.

== Capital group ==
The Getin Noble Bank group:

- Getin Bank
- Noble Bank
- Open Finance
- Noble Funds TFI
- Noble Securities
- Getin Leasing
- Noble Concierge

== Shareholders ==
LC CORP BV	356 874 554	39,58%
MR DR LESZEK CZARNECKI	88 208 870	9,78%
GETIN HOLDING	66 771 592	7,41%

== See also ==
- List of banks in Poland
