= Lymphokine-activated killer T-cell-originated protein kinase =

Protein-coding gene in the species Homo sapiens

PBK

Identifiers
- Aliases: PBK, CT84, HEL164, Nori-3, SPK, TOPK, PDZ binding kinase
- External IDs: OMIM: 611210; MGI: 1289156; GeneCards: PBK
Enzyme activity
EC #	BRENDA	ExPASy	KEGG	MetaCyc
2.7.12.2	↗	↗	↗	↗

Gene location (Human)
Chr.	Chromosome 8 (human)
Band	8p21.1	Start	27,809,624 bp
Band	8p21.1	End	27,838,082 bp

Gene location (Mouse)
Chr.	Chromosome 14 (mouse)
Band	14 D1|14 34.36 cM	Start	66,043,286 bp
Band	14 D1|14 34.36 cM	End	66,055,271 bp
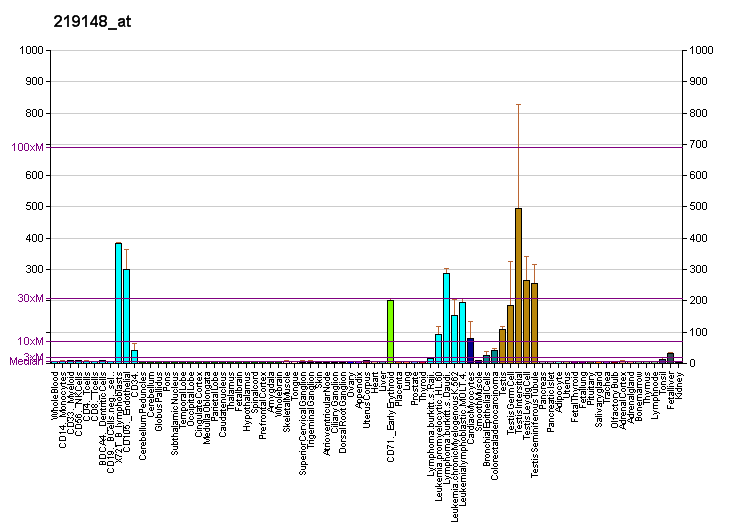
RNA expression pattern
Bgee	Human / Mouse (ortholog); Top expressed in: ventricular zone; sperm; ganglionic eminence; gonad; left testis; right testis; secondary oocyte; testicle; mucosa of transverse colon; rectum / Top expressed in: spermatocyte; medial ganglionic eminence; superior cervical ganglion; seminiferous tubule; endocardial cushion; Paneth cell; migratory enteric neural crest cell; ventricular zone; renal corpuscle; otic vesicle; More reference expression data
BioGPS	More reference expression data
Gene ontology
Molecular function	kinase activity; transferase activity; nucleotide binding; protein serine/threonine kinase activity; protein kinase activity; protein binding; ATP binding
Cellular component	nucleus
Biological process	cellular response to UV; negative regulation of protein phosphorylation; protein phosphorylation; negative regulation of stress-activated MAPK cascade; negative regulation of inflammatory response; phosphorylation; negative regulation of proteasomal ubiquitin-dependent protein catabolic process; mitotic cell cycle
Sources:Amigo / QuickGO
Orthologs
Databases	NCBI: entry; OMA: entry
Species	Human	Mouse
Entrez	55872	52033
Ensembl	55872	ENSMUSG00000022033
UniProt	Q96KB5	Q9JJ78
RefSeq (mRNA)	NM_001278945; NM_018492; NM_001363040	NM_023209
RefSeq (protein)	NP_001265874; NP_060962; NP_001349969	NP_075698
Location (UCSC)	Chr 8: 27.81 – 27.84 Mb	Chr 14: 66.04 – 66.06 Mb
PubMed search
- Wikidata
View/Edit Human	View/Edit Mouse

Lymphokine-activated killer T-cell-originated protein kinase is an enzyme that in humans is encoded by the PBK gene.

The protein encoded by this gene is a serine/threonine kinase related to the dual specific mitogen-activated protein kinase kinase (MAPKK) family. Evidence suggests that mitotic phosphorylation is required for its catalytic activity. This mitotic kinase may be involved in the activation of lymphoid cells and support testicular functions, with a suggested role in the process of spermatogenesis.
