= National Bank of Poland =

Coordinates: 52°14′11″N 21°00′53″E

National Bank of Poland Narodowy Bank Polski

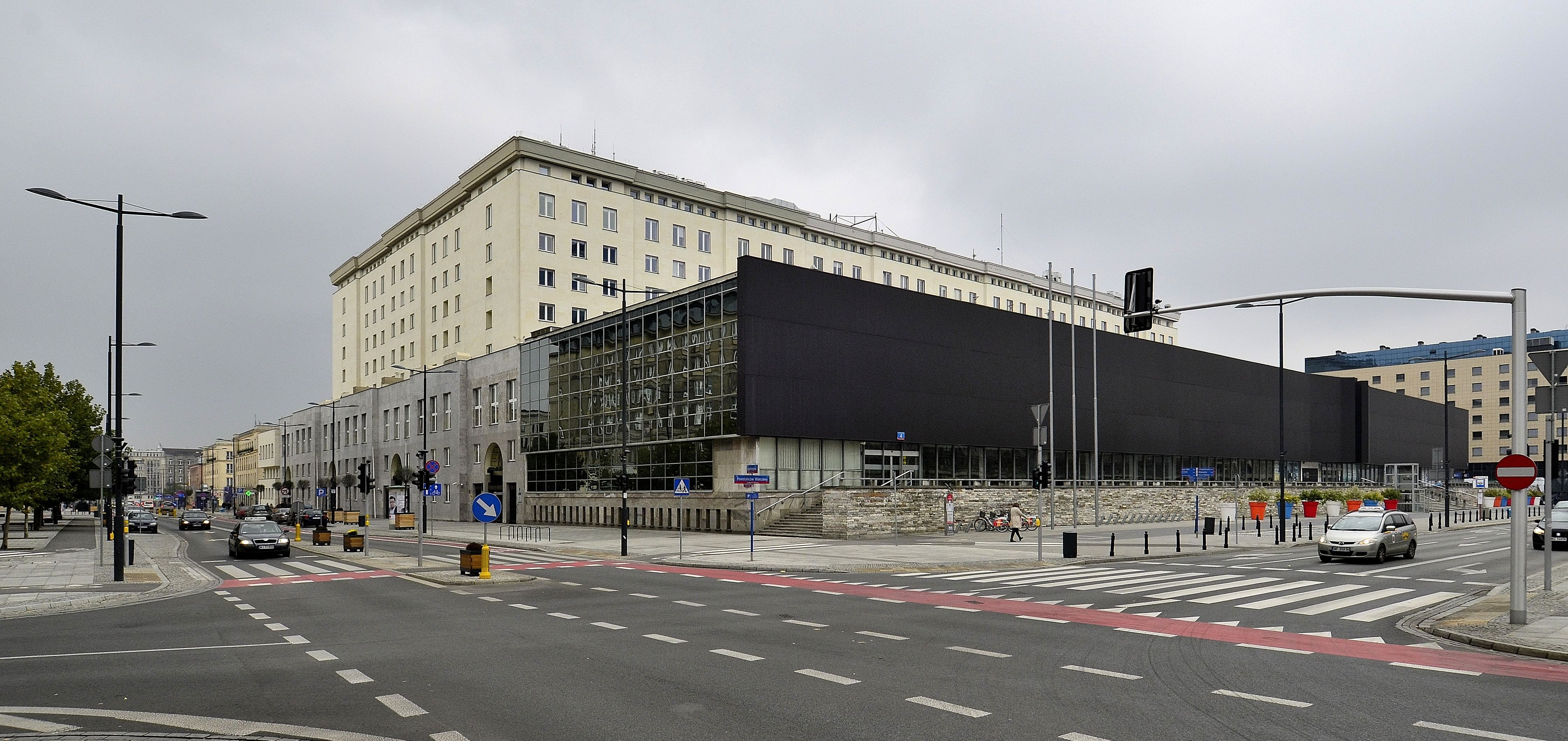
- Headquarters of the National Bank of Poland in Warsaw
- Central bank of: Poland
- Headquarters: Warsaw, Poland
- Established: 1945
- Ownership: 100% state ownership
- President: Adam Glapiński
- Currency: Polish złoty (zł); PLN (ISO 4217)
- Reserves: $271 billion (Dec 2025)
- Bank rate: 3.75%
- Preceded by: Bank Polski SA (1924-1952); Bank of Issue (1940-1945)
- Website: nbp.pl/en (in Polish and English)

The Narodowy Bank Polski (pronounced [narɔdɔvɨ bank pɔlski]; the National Bank of Poland), often abbreviated to NBP, is the central bank of Poland, founded in 1945. It controls the issuing of Poland's currency, the Polish złoty. The bank is headquartered in Warsaw, and has branches in 16 major Polish cities. The NBP represents Poland in the European System of Central Banks, an EU organization. The bank uses its Polish name Narodowy Bank Polski in all its English-language communications.

The NBP is also a member of the European Systemic Risk Board (ESRB).

== History ==
The National Bank was established on 15 January 1945 by decree of the Provisional Government of the Republic of Poland, three days before its relocation from Lublin to Warsaw. It also claims the legacy of two previous central banks, both named Bank of Poland (Polish: Bank Polski): the First Bank of Poland was founded in Warsaw in 1828 by Prince Franciszek Ksawery Drucki-Lubecki under the government of the Kingdom of Poland, and the Second Bank of Poland, founded in 1924, was the central bank of the Second Polish Republic which went into exile during World War II.

The Bank of Poland's gold reserves of Poland were transferred in 1939 to Romania, the United Kingdom and Canada. In November 1946, following the cancellation of Poland's wartime debt, the larger part of prewar gold reserves were returned to new communist authorities. In 1947, the gold deposited in Romania in 1939 was returned, while the former Bank of Poland itself was closed down and finally in 1952 absorbed by the newly created Narodowy Bank Polski.

The NBP was one of a handful of banks operating in Poland's postwar planned economy and single-tier banking system. It had a monopoly for currency, credits and accumulation of savings. Powszechna Kasa Oszczędności (PKO) served private accounts, while Polska Kasa Opieki (PeKaO) and Bank Handlowy focused on international transactions and agricultural credit was operated by Bank Rolny, succeeded by Bank Gospodarki Żywnościowej (BGŻ) in 1975. A long-term credit bank, Bank Inwestycyjny, was terminated in 1970s with its operations folded into PKO, Bank Handlowy and the NBP. The NBP had no independence from the government, and its president held rank as undersecretary of state at the Finance Ministry. In 1975, the branch network of PKO was integrated into the NBP.

In the 1980s, Poland started moving away from the communist template towards a more commercialized banking system. New legislation in 1982 separated the NBP from the Ministry of Finance and gave a role to the Sejm in appointing its president. In 1987, Bank Rozwoju Eksportu (BRE) was established to promote exports in competition with PeKaO and Bank Handlowy. In 1988, PKO was fully separated from the NBP. The end of the single-tier system came in early 1989, as the NBP's non-monetary credit operations were spun off into nine regional banks which took over around 400 NBP branches and would form the backbone of Poland's new commercial banking sector. These were, by decreasing size of total assets in the mid-1990s: Powszechny Bank Gospodarczy (Bank PBG) in Łódź; Bank Śląski in Katowice; Powszechny Bank Kredytowy (Bank PBK) in Warsaw; Bank Przemysłowo-Handlowy (Bank BPH) in Kraków; Bank Zachodni in Wrocław; Wielkopolski Bank Kredytowy (Bank WBK) in Poznań; Bank Gdański in Gdańsk; Pomorski Bank Kredytowy (Bank PBKS) in Szczecin; and Bank Depozytowo-Kredytowy (Bank BDK) in Lublin.

== Operations ==
The structure and functioning of the Narodowy Bank Polski are regulated by article 227 of the Constitution of Poland of 1997 and the Narodowy Bank Polski Act of the same year. The president of the NBP is appointed by the Sejm, at the request of the president of the Republic of Poland, for a term of six years. The NBP president is responsible for the organisation and functioning of the Polish's central bank. The same person cannot serve as president of the NBP for more than two terms of office. Apart from his function as the superior of the NBP staff, he is also the chairman of the Monetary Policy Council, the NBP management board and the Commission for Banking Supervision. He is also responsible for representing Poland in international banking and financial institutions.

In 2019, the average employment at the National Bank of Poland on full-time amounts was 3312 people.

== Leadership ==
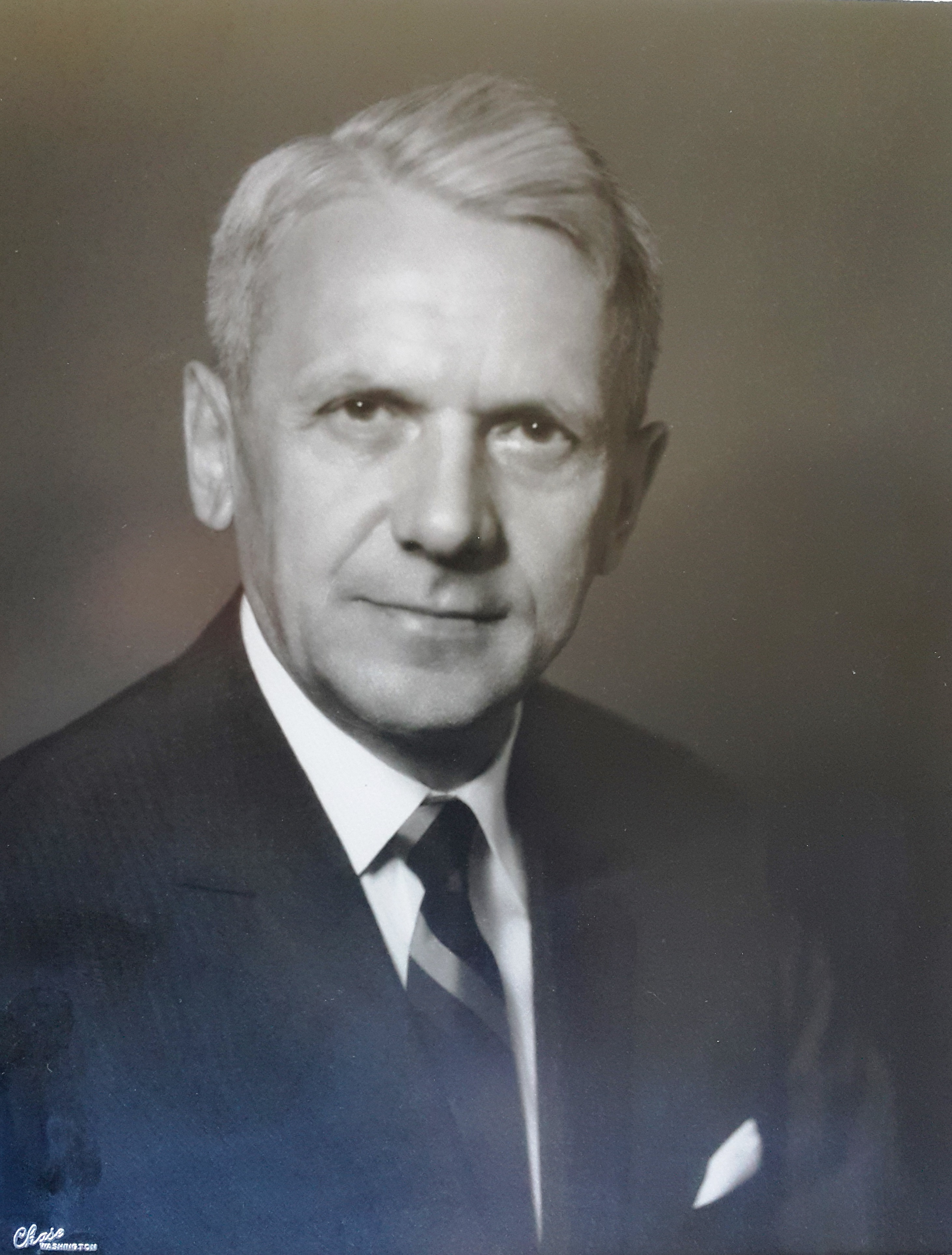
Edward Drożniak (1902-1966), first president of the NBP

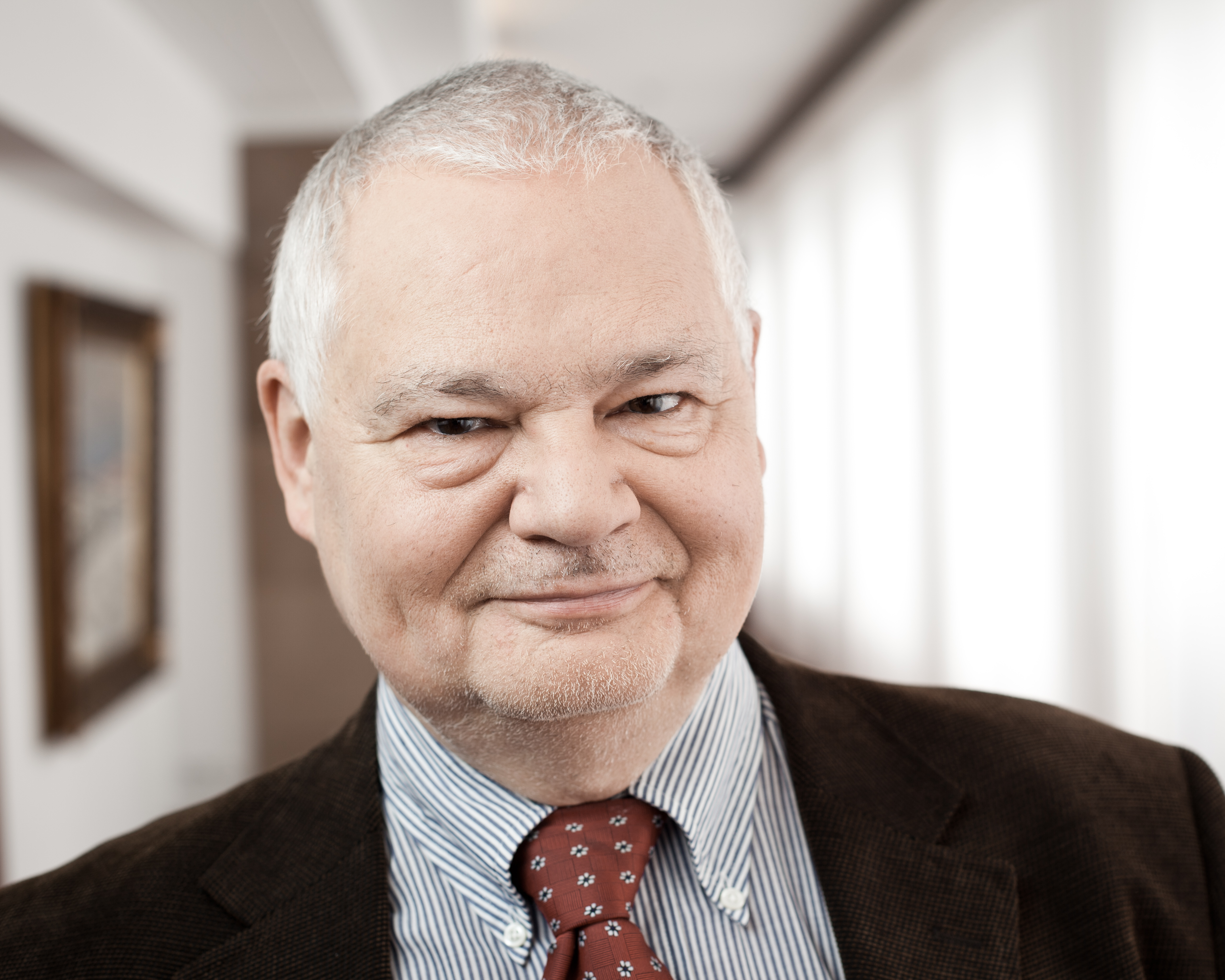
Adam Glapinski in 2015, the current president of the NBP

The successive presidents of the NBP have been:

- Edward Drożniak (1945–1949)
- Witold Trąmpczyński (1950–1956)
- Edward Drożniak (2nd term, 1956–1961)
- Adam Żebrowski (1961–1965)
- Stanisław Majewski (1965–1968)
- Leonard Siemiątkowski (1968–1972)
- Witold Bień (1973–1980)
- Stanisław Majewski (2nd term, 1981–1985)
- Zdzisław Pakuła (acting, 1985)
- Władysław Baka (1985–1988)
- Zdzisław Pakuła (1988–1989)
- Władysław Baka (2nd term, 1989–1991)
- Grzegorz Wójtowicz (1991)
- Andrzej Topiński (acting, 1991–1992)
- Hanna Gronkiewicz-Waltz (1992–2001)
- Leszek Balcerowicz (2001–2007)
- Sławomir Skrzypek (2007–2010)
- Piotr Wiesiołek (acting, 2010)
- Marek Belka (2010–2016)
- Adam Glapiński (since 2016)

== Awards ==
- 2011 – award granted during the Numismatic Fair in Berlin "World Money Fair" for the Silver NBP coin with a denomination of PLN 10, dedicated to the Polish Underground State.
- 2012 – 1st place at the International Coin of the Year (Coty) competition and the title of the most interesting coin of 2011 for NBP coins "Europe without barriers".
- 2016 – the title of the most interesting coin of the world in the prestigious numismatic contest Coin of the Year 2016 for the coins issued by the NBP, commemorating the 100th birthday of Jan Karski.
- 2017 – award on the Currency Conference for a collector's banknote "1050th anniversary of the Christianization of Poland" issued by the NBP.
- 2020 – main award by Dziennik Gazeta Prawna for supporting entrepreneurs during pandemic.

== Buildings ==
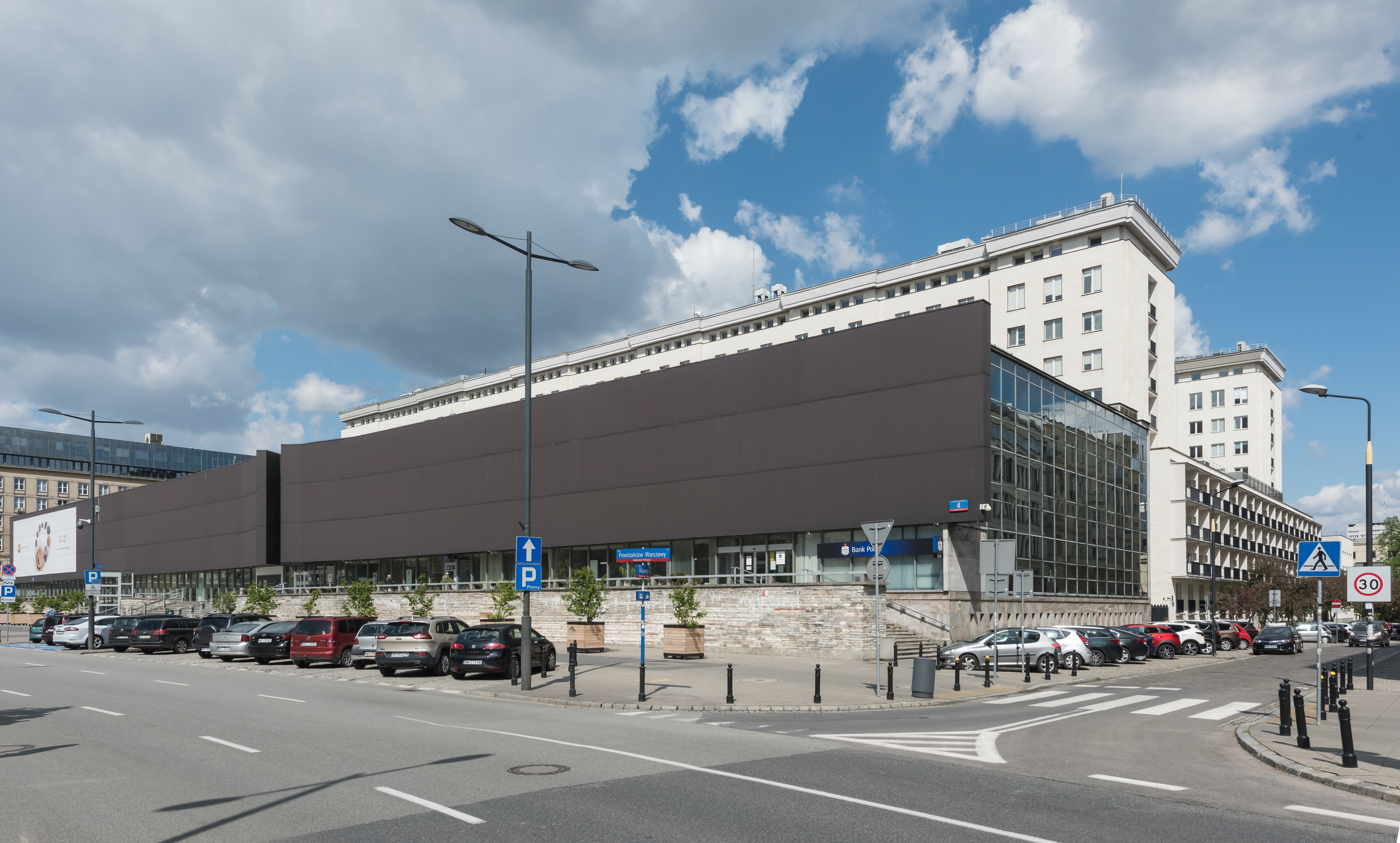
Warsaw

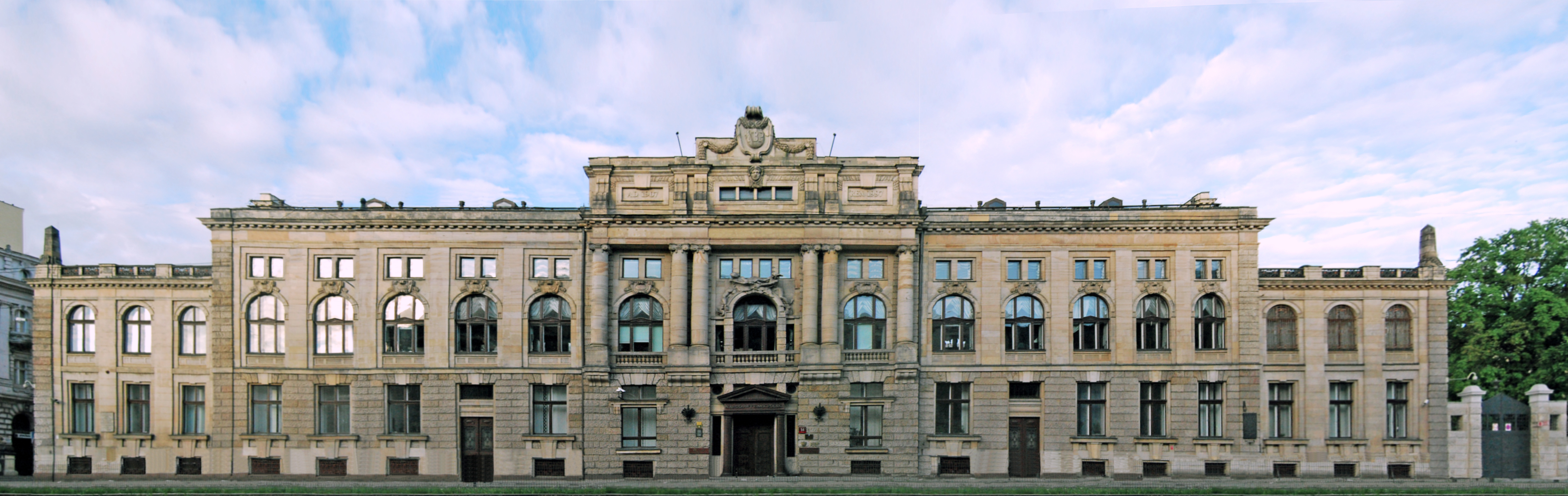
Łódź

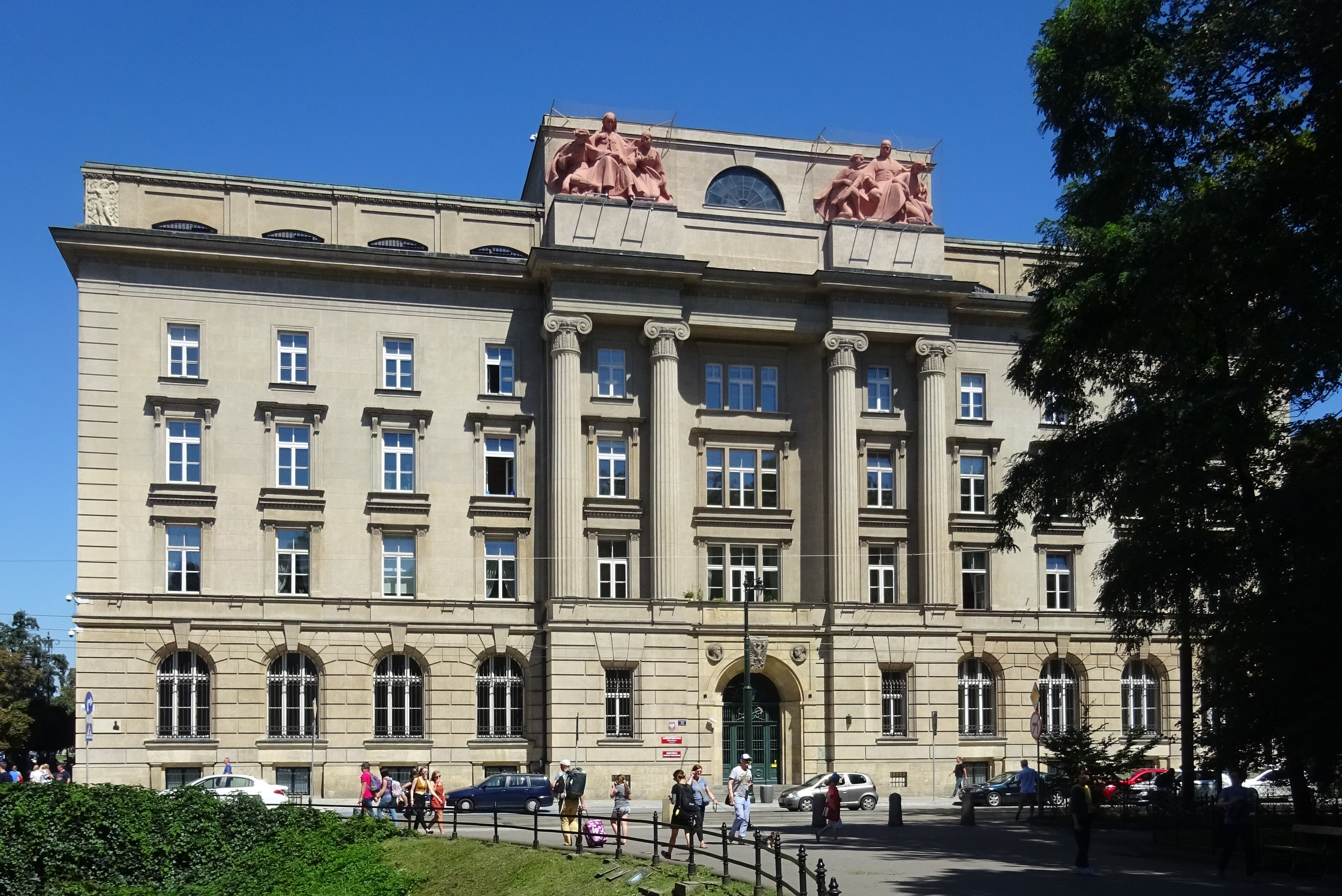
Kraków

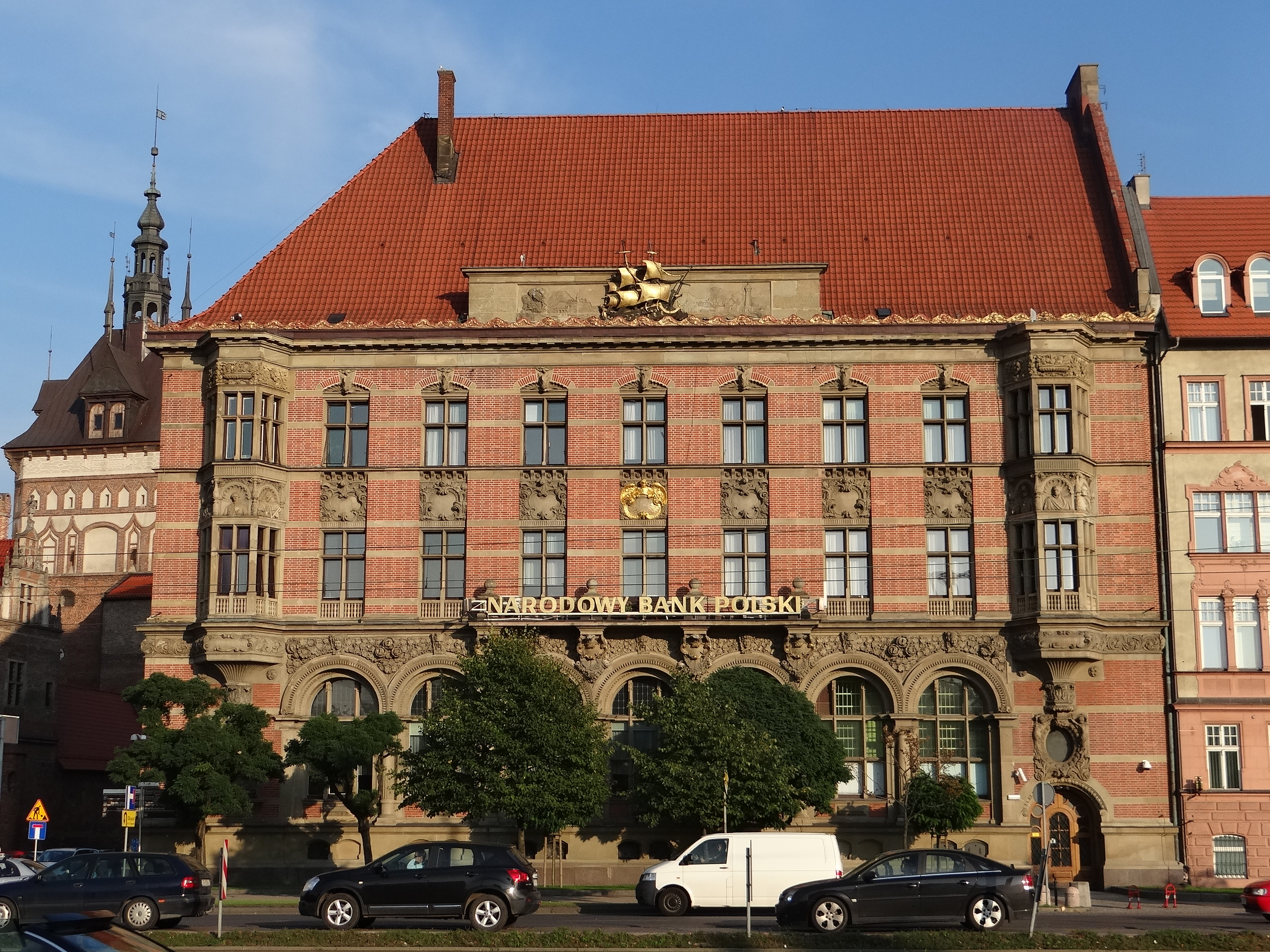
Gdańsk

== See also ==
- Economy of Poland
- Monetary Policy Council
- Polish złoty
- List of central banks
- List of banks in Poland
