= Salt Bank =

Romanian bank

- Type: Private
- Industry: Finance and Insurance
- Predecessor: Romanian International Bank SA; Idea Bank SA
- Founded: 1998; 28 years ago
- Headquarters: Bucharest, Romania
- Key people: Robert Anghel (CEO); Sorin Dumitrescu (Deputy CEO, Risk); Vikram Tikoo (Deputy CEO, Technology); Sinan Kircali (Deputy CEO, Operations)
- Products: Financial services
- Owner: Banca Transilvania S.A. (99.5%); B.T. Investments S.R.L. (0.5%)
- Parent: Banca Transilvania
- Website: salt.bank

Salt Bank (formerly Romanian International Bank and Idea Bank) is a Romanian digital bank headquartered in Bucharest. It was officially launched on 4 April 2024 as the first 100% digital bank "made in Romania", developed by Banca Transilvania through the transformation of the former Idea Bank. The bank offers services through a mobile application available in Romania, Austria, Germany, France, Belgium, the Netherlands, Italy, Spain and the United Kingdom for Romanian citizens. Within a few years of operation, the bank reportedly reached the top 10 banks in Romania by number of customers and second place for customer satisfaction in the Romanian banking system, according to a Mercury Research study.

The idea behind the bank is to offer a simplified and accessible banking experience, removing the need to visit a physical branch and allowing customers to manage their accounts remotely.

== History ==
The bank was founded in 1998 as Romanian International Bank (RIB), majority owned by American capital; from May 2002 its main shareholder was the Daniel Roberts family, majority shareholder of the American bank Merchants Bank of California. At the end of June 2006, the bank's assets stood at €69.7 million.

On 4 December 2014, the Polish group Getin Holding acquired Romanian International Bank, in a transaction brokered by Crosspoint Investment Banking & Real Estate. Following the rebranding, Romanian International Bank relaunched on 22 April 2015 under a new identity, as Idea Bank.

In 2021, Banca Transilvania acquired Idea Bank through a share purchase. In 2024, it was renamed Salt Bank. Its subsidiary Idea::Broker de Asigurare became BT Broker de Asigurare, and Idea::Leasing IFN SA became Avant Leasing IFN SA.

In March 2026, following approval from the National Bank of Romania, Robert Anghel, formerly deputy CEO for Business, took over as chief executive officer (CEO) of Salt Bank from Gabriela Nistor, who had led the bank since launch and remained a member of the board of directors, continuing to contribute to its strategic direction.

== Products and features ==
Salt Bank built a fully digital platform without legacy technology, which it has continuously expanded with new products and features, launching more than 400 app updates in its first year of operation alone.

Payments and transfers. The bank integrated RoPay, Romania's national instant payment system, which lets customers send and receive money in real time using only a phone number, regardless of the recipient's bank, with no fees between RoPay users. Its Pay Bill feature allows customers to pay electricity, television, internet or gas bills directly from the app, without needing to look up customer codes or invoices in email. The bank also launched instant euro payments through the RO-TIPS system, with real-time transfers to more than 30 European countries, as well as a "Low Cost Transfers" service, with a fixed fee (5 lei for individuals, 10 lei for companies) for international transfers to nine countries, including the United Kingdom, the United States and Canada. For customers who travel or spend in foreign currency, the bank offers a Multicurrency card covering up to 19 currencies at favourable exchange rates.

Lending. In 2025, Salt Bank launched a fully digital personal loan, giving customers access to up to 200,000 lei directly from the app. The bank set a speed record for granting a loan, approved entirely digitally in just 2 minutes and 50 seconds.

Investments. Through Salt Investments, customers can invest in international stocks, ETFs and mutual funds starting from €1, directly from the app; Salt Bank was the first bank in Romania to offer simultaneous access to local and international markets within the same app.

Entrepreneurs and business. Salt Business offers accounts and tools dedicated to freelancers, sole traders (PFAs) and small entrepreneurs, complemented by Salt Business Club, a benefits programme extending beyond traditional banking services.

Subscriptions. In June 2026, the bank introduced two banking plans with extended benefits: Salt Everyday, which includes multiple digital cards, monthly cash withdrawals of up to 1,500 lei and free instant payments within the EU, and Salt Premium, with a multicurrency Platinum card (with an optional metal variant), airport lounge access, European travel insurance and roadside assistance.

Insurance. Customers can purchase and manage compulsory motor third-party liability (RCA) insurance policies directly from the app, and in 2025 the bank entered bancassurance partnerships with NN and Asirom.

Customer safety. Salt Bank launched the Call Monitor feature, which confirms in the app whether an incoming call really is from the bank, and Help Mama, which alerts customers when an elderly or vulnerable parent who holds an account attempts an unusually large payment, blocking the transaction until it is approved — two features described as unique on the Romanian market. To encourage saving, the bank introduced the "Saving Challenge", a programme through which customers can automatically set aside between 10 and 100 lei per day for 100 days, with a bonus for consistency.

Recognition. Salt Bank has received more than 50 national and international awards, including "Best Digital Bank" at the FinTech Breakthrough Awards 2025 and "Best Use of Tech in Retail Banking" at the Banking Tech Awards 2024.

== See also ==
- List of banks in Romania
