= Powszechny Bank Gospodarczy w Łódzi =

Former Polish bank

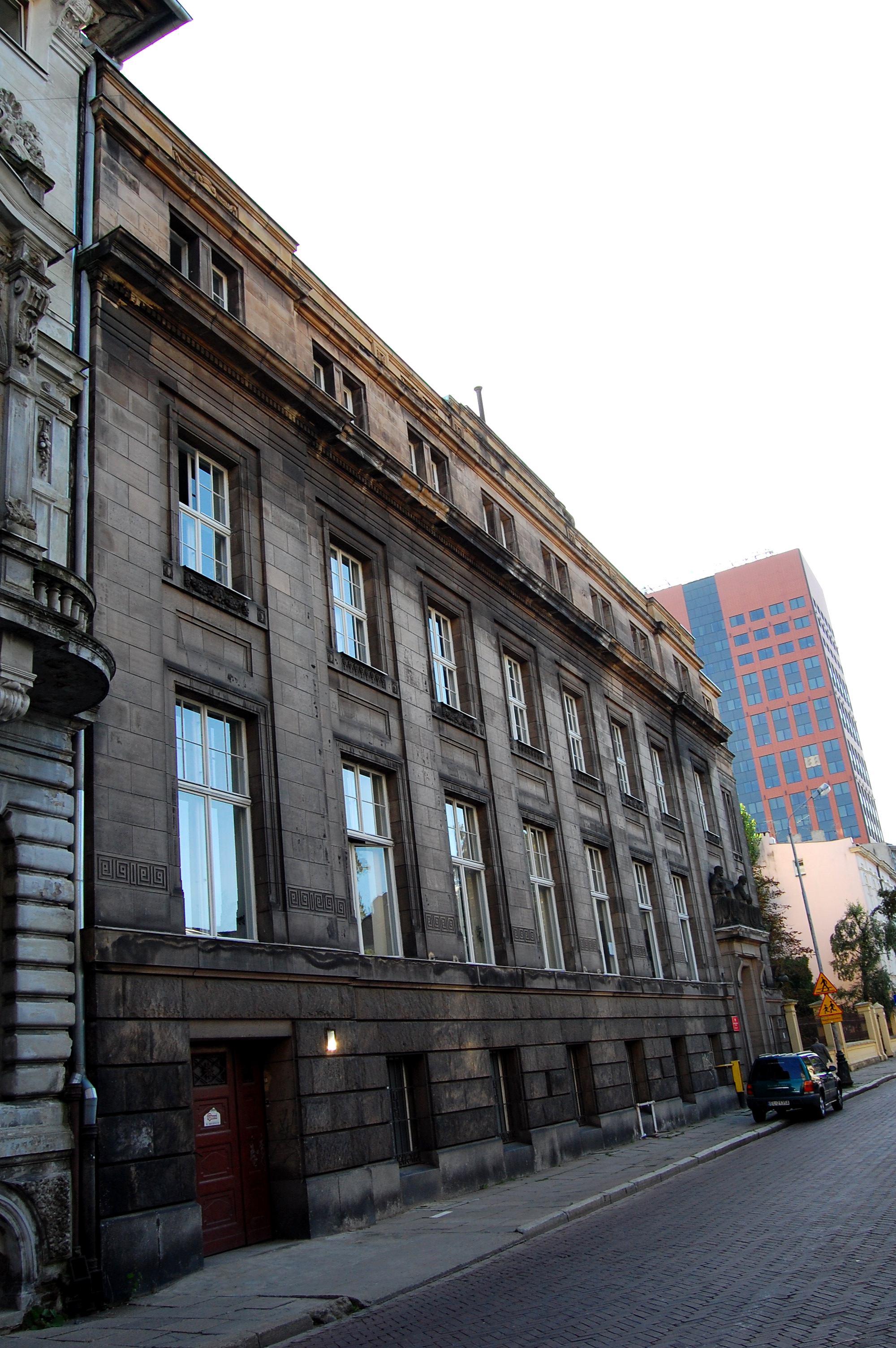
- Former building of the Mutual Credit Society of Industrialists at 15 Roosevelt Street in Łódź, which became the registered office of Bank PBG
- Type: State-owned enterprise
- Industry: Financial services
- Predecessor: National Bank of Poland
- Founded: 1988
- Defunct: 1999
- Fate: Acquired
- Successor: Bank Pekao
- Headquarters: Łódź, Poland
- Area served: Poland
- Products: Banking services

Powszechny Bank Gospodarczy w Łódzi (lit. 'General Economic Bank in Łódź'), also known as Bank PBG, was a Polish bank based in Łódź. It was established in 1988-1989, and absorbed in 1999 by Bank Pekao.

== History ==
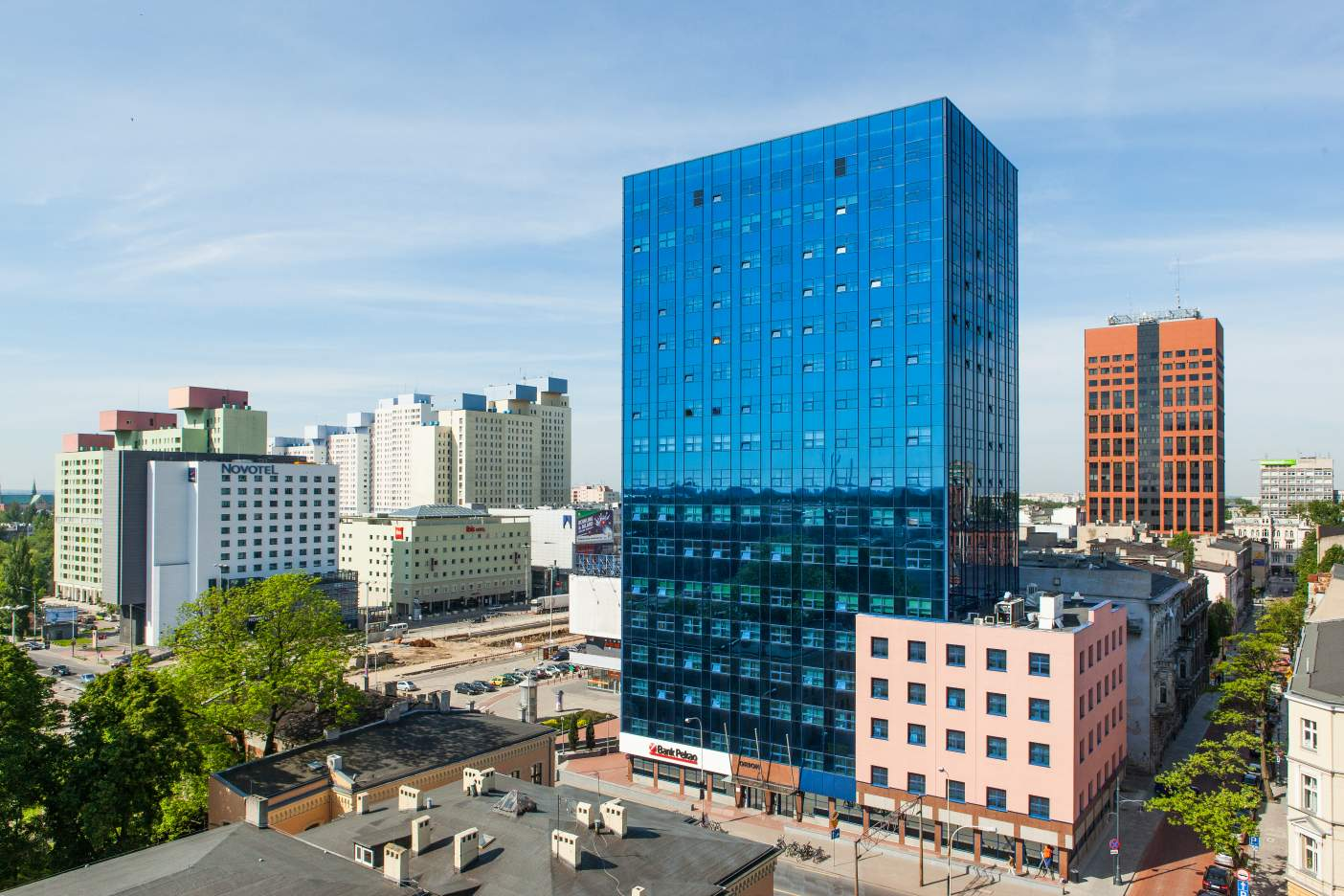
Bank PBG was the onwer of the Orion Business Tower in Łódź

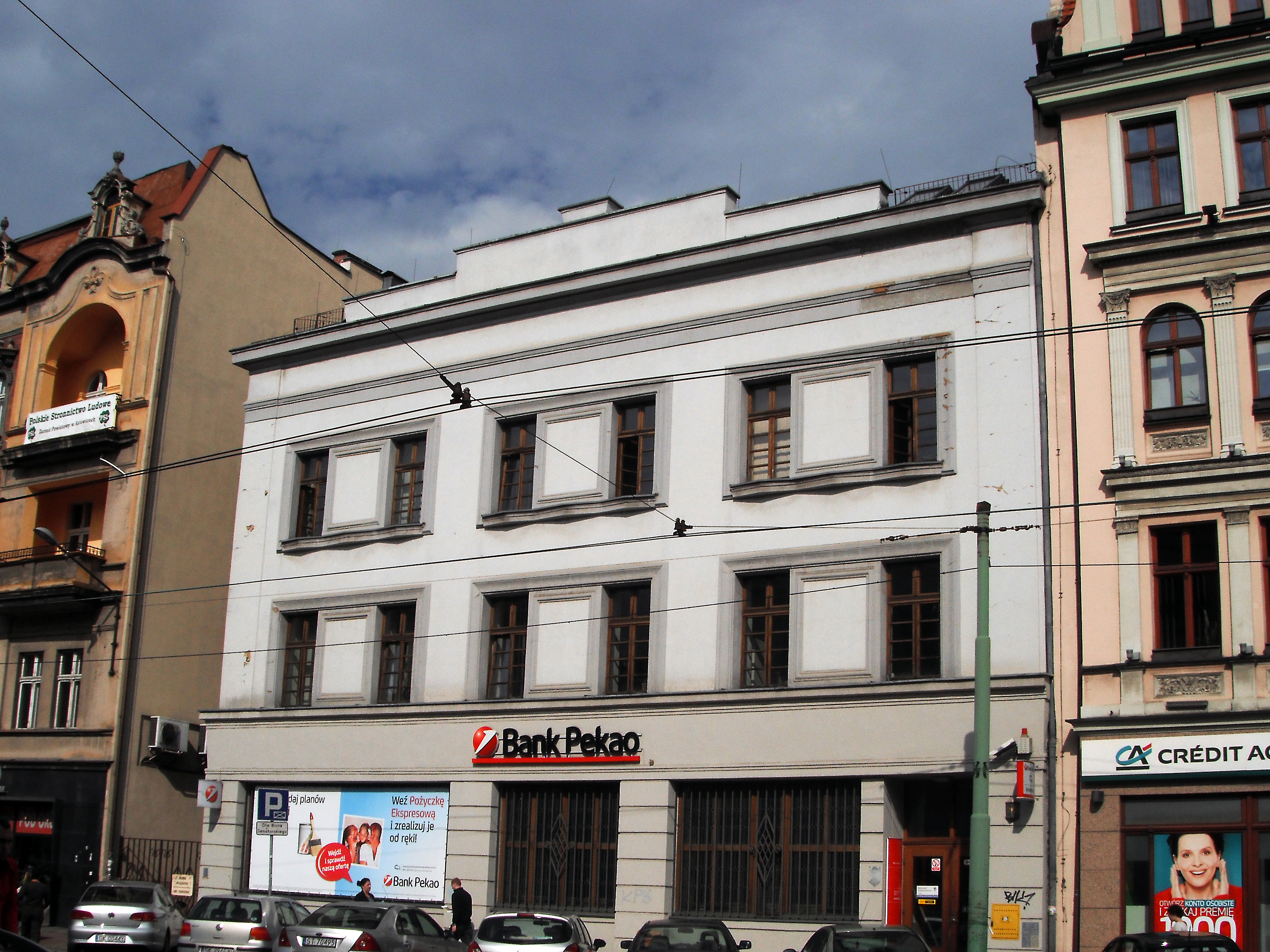
Former PBG branch in Katowice

Bank PBG was one of nine banks spun off in the late 1980s from the National Bank of Poland, the culmination of a sequence of reforms during the 1980s that brought an end to the country's single-tier banking system. Specifically, it was established pursuant to the Regulation of the Council of Ministers of 11 April 1988 on the establishment of Powszechny Bank Gospodarczy in Łódź, which entered into force on the date of its announcement.

Bank PBG's headquarters was located in Łódź at 15 Roosevelt Street. It started operations on 1 January 1989, taking over 28 former branches from the NBP.

On 8 October 1991, Bank PBG was transformed into a joint-stock company, fully owned by the Polish State Treasury. By the mid-1990s it was the largest of the nine regional banks spun off from the NBP, and the fifth-largest Polish bank overall behind PKO Bank Polski, Bank Pekao, Bank Handlowy, and Bank BGŻ.

In 1996, a government decision brought together Polska Kasa Opieki with Bank PBG and two of its peers established in 1989, Bank Depozytowo-Kredytowy in Lublin and Pomorski Bank Kredytowy in Szczecin. On 26 November 1996, Bank PBG absorbed People's Cooperative Bank in Łódź, originally established in 1899, which had come under financial distress and had suspended operations in 1995. In October 1998 it started offering online services to its retail customers, the first bank in Poland to do so. On 1 January 1999, the four banks were merged into Bank Polska Kasa Opieki SA, or Bank Pekao.

Bank PBG was led throughout its period of operation by Andrzej Szukalski.

== See also ==
- Sławomir Lachowski
- List of banks in Poland
