= Cooperative banking in Poland =

Sector history

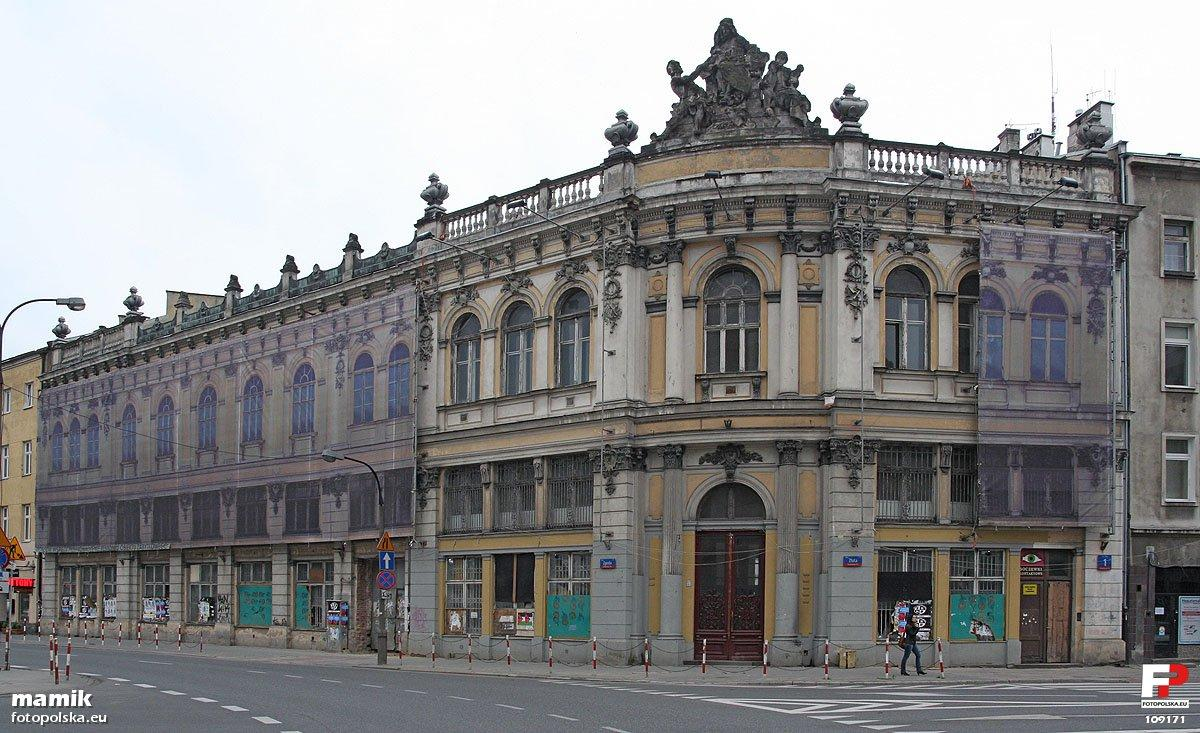
Former head office building of the Kasa Pożyczkowa Przemysłowców, designed by Stefan Szyller and erected in the 1890s in Warsaw

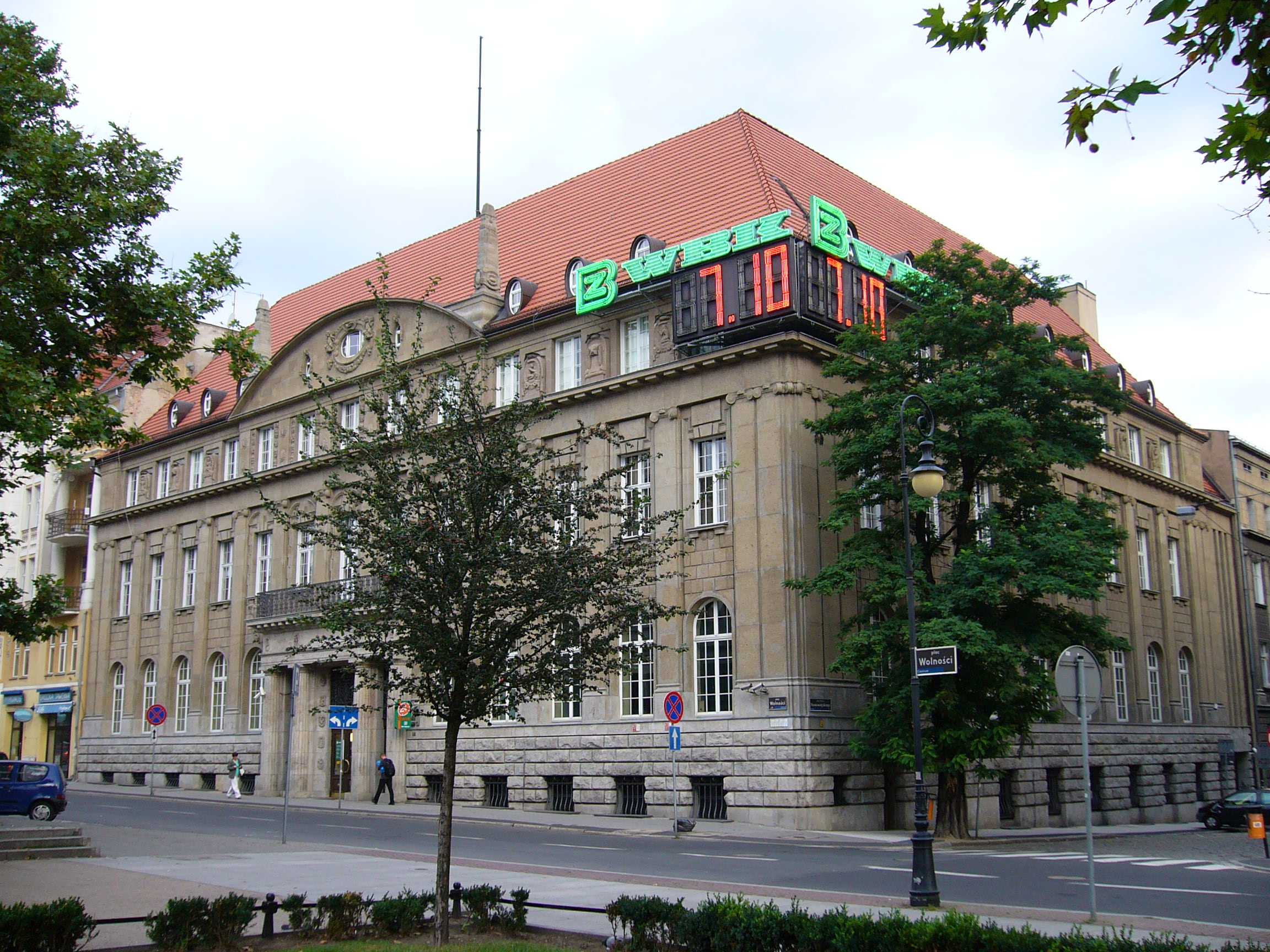
Former head office of Bank Związku Spółek Zarobkowych (BZSZ) between 1920 and 1949, at 15 Wolności Square in Poznań; later the head office of Wielkopolski Bank Kredytowy

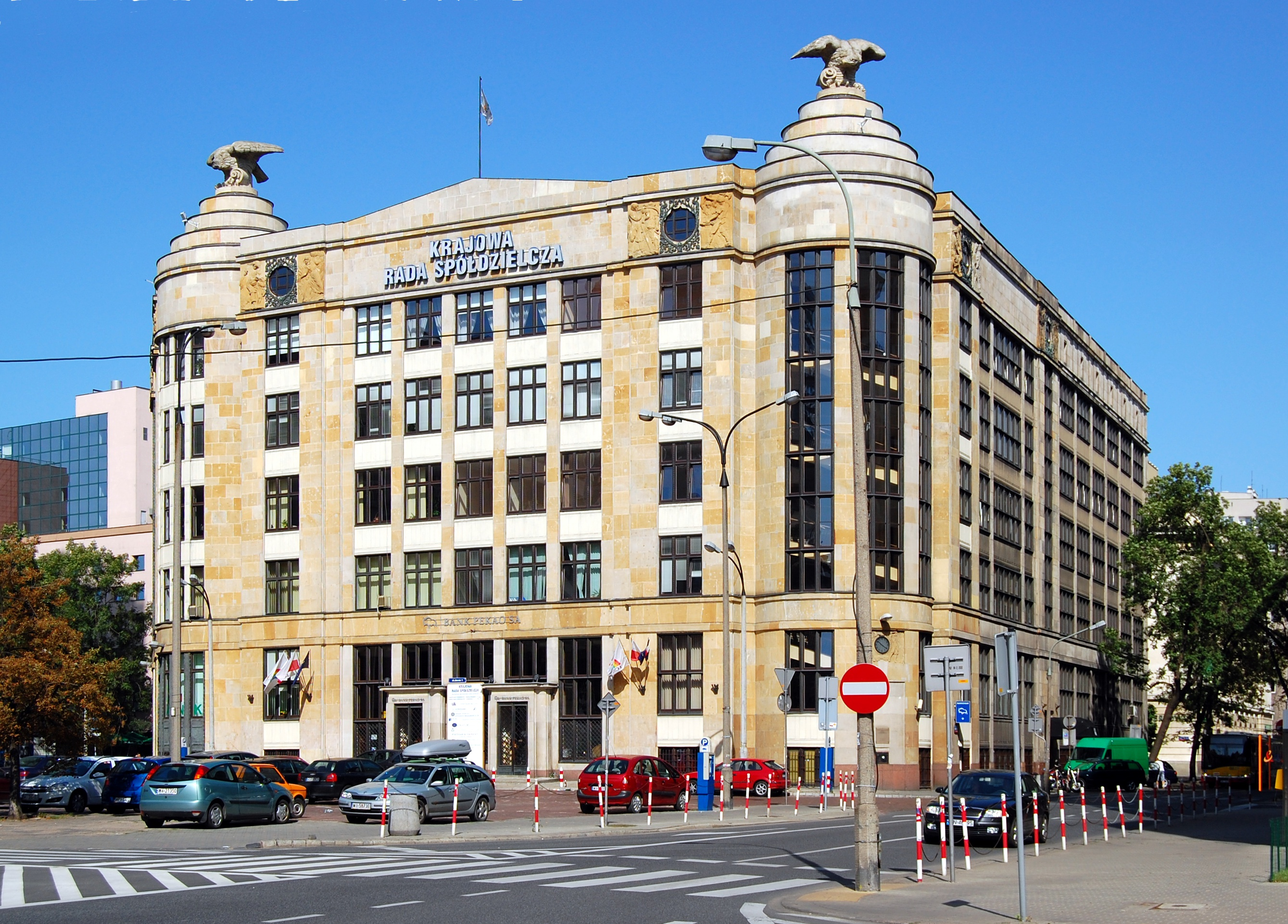
Former head office of Bank Towarzystw Spółdzielczych in Warsaw, known as the House of Eagles, designed by architect Jan Fryderyk Heurich and completed in 1917; later seat of the National Bank of Poland in the 1950s, and lately of the National Council of Cooperatives

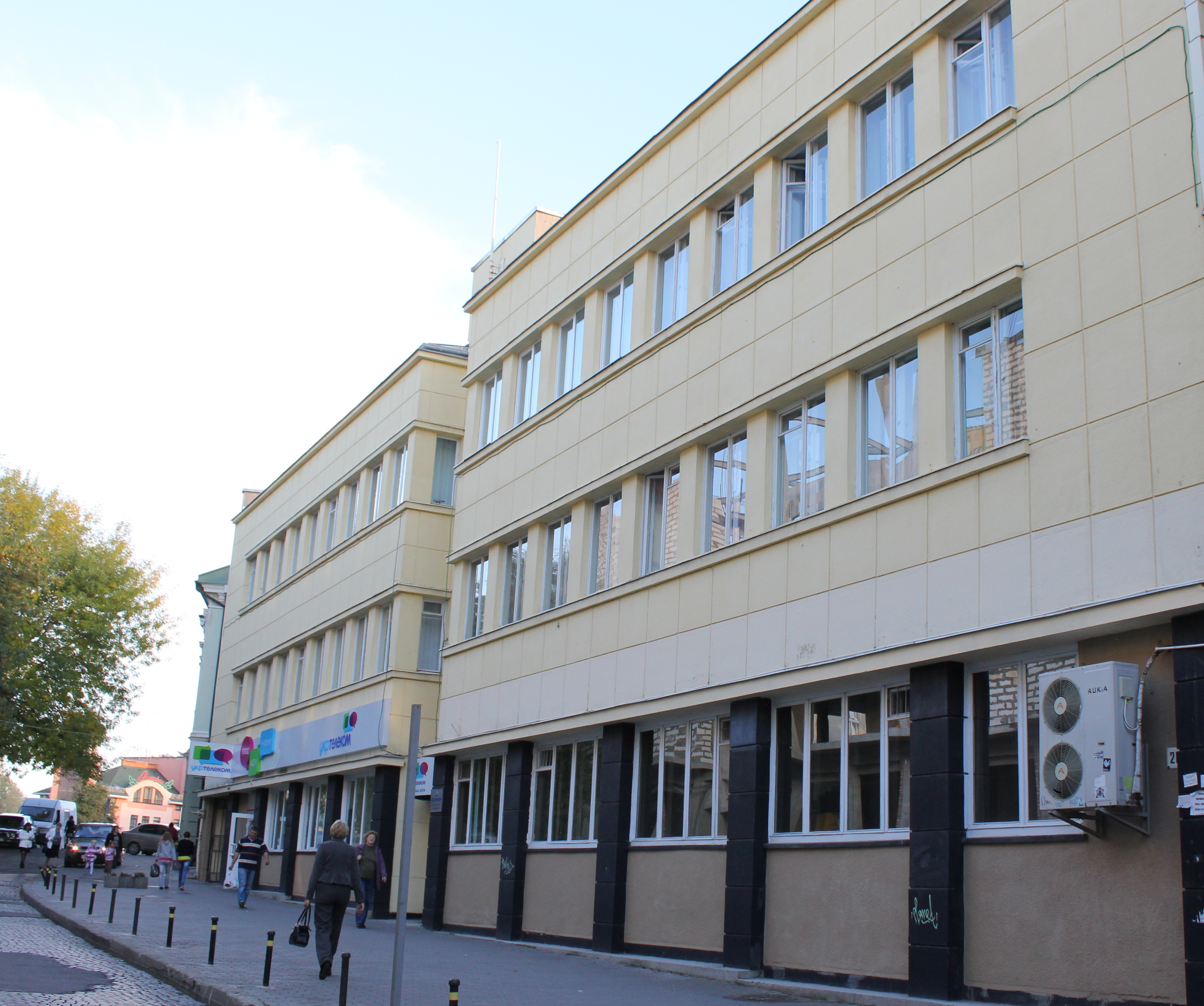
Former branch building of the Centralna Kasa Spółek Rolniczych in Lutsk, designed by architect Witold Marcinkowski and completed in 1938

The history of cooperative banking in Poland goes back to the late 1850s, and has mirrored the changing fortunes of the territories that now form Poland. Its origins go back to the third quarter of the 19th century in the Polish territories that were then respectively ruled by the Habsburg monarchy, Prussia and the German Empire, and the Russian Empire. Cooperative banks then largely coalesced into a single national system in the interwar period, but suffered heavily during World War II and the early period of the subsequent Communist regime. Nevertheless, the sector displayed long-term resilience and adapted to the conditions of the post-Communist transition. As of the mid-2020s it is dominated by two nationwide cooperative banking networks, the BPS Group and SGB Group.

== Partitioned Poland ==
In partitioned Poland, cooperative banks on parallel paths in the three components of what would later become Polish territory, building up - like elsewhere in Europe - on the mid-19th-century German experiments of Hermann Schulze-Delitzsch and Friedrich Wilhelm Raiffeisen.

- In the Prussian-ruled Province of Posen, the first cooperative banks included the banki ludowe (German: Volksbanken) in Śrem/Schrimm (1859) and Brodnica/Strasburg (1862) as well as the Towarzystwo Pożyczkowe dla Przemysłowców Poznania (lit. 'Poznań Industrialists' Loan Society') in Poznań/Posen, established in 1861. In 1871, the cooperative banks associated with the Catholic Church formed the Związek Spółek Zarobkowych i Gospodarczych (ZSZiG, lit. 'Association of Commercial and Economic Companies'), which in 1885 established a central financing entity, the Bank Związku Spółek Zarobkowych (BZSZ, lit. 'Bank of the Association of Commercial Companies'). The ZSZiG and BZSZ were jointly led by Catholic clerics, first Augustyn Szamarzewski until 1891 then Piotr Wawrzyniak until 1910 and Stanisław Adamski until 1926. In the 1890s and 1900s, the ZSZiG's network of local cooperative banks expanded to the Prussian provinces of Pomerania, Warmia, Masuria, and Upper Silesia.
- In the Austrian-ruled Kingdom of Galicia and Lodomeria, the first short-lived cooperative bank was established in Berezhany in 1864. In 1890, Franciszek Stefczyk created the first Raiffeisen-style credit union in Czernichów, Kraków County, then in 1899 the Biuro Patronatu dla Spółek Oszczędności i Pożyczek przy Wydziale Krajowym we Lwowie (lit. 'Patronage Office for Savings and Loan Companies at the National Branch in Lviv', with official support from Bank Krajowy), and on 26 March 1907 the Krajowa Centralna Kasa dla Spółek Rolniczych we Lwowie (German: Landeszentralkase für landwirtschaftliche Genossenschaften in Lemberg, lit. 'Central Provincial Bank for Agricultural Cooperatives in Lviv'), a central financial services provider. The latter, based in Lemberg/Lwów/Lviv and also referred to as Centralna Kasa Spółek Rolniczyc or CKSR, was fully owned by the Wydział Krajowy, a semi-autonomous entity of the Galician-Lodomerian government. It started operations on 1 January 1909 following the enactment in Vienna of legislation approving it in 1908.
- In Russian-ruled Congress Poland, the Kasa Pożyczkowa Przemysłowców (lit. 'Industrial Loan Bank') was established in Warsaw in 1870, inspired by Schulze-Delitzsch's principles but taking the form of a joint-stock company. The Warszawskie Towarzystwo Wzajemnego Kredytu (lit. 'Warsaw Mutual Credit Society') followed in 1872. Raiffeisen-style cooperative banks developed dynamically especially after new legislation in 1904. In 1909, the Bank Towarzystw Spółdzielczych (BTS, lit. 'Bank of Cooperative Societies') was established in Warsaw as a central entity, also as a joint-stock entity. Social activist Edward Abramowski was instrumental in the development of the consumer cooperative movement, known as Społem (lit. 'Together').

By mid-1914, 5,029 cooperative banks existed in all of partitioned Poland, serving over two million members.

== Second Polish Republic and WWII occupation ==
Following the turmoil of World War I and its hyperinflationary immediate aftermath, the BZSZ came under the ownership of private individuals even as it kept providing services to local cooperative banks. Remaining in Poznań, it relocated in 1920 into the head office building that had been erected for itself in 1910–1911 by the Ostbank für Handel und Gewerbe, a German-owned bank that was expropriated following the postwar regime change. In 1919, the CKSR absorbed the Kasa Centralna Rolniczych Stowarzyszeń Pożyczkowych (lit. 'Central Bank of Agricultural Loan Associations') and relocated from Lviv to Warsaw, while its ownership changed to include both the newly formed Polish state (succeeding the Galician Wydział Krajowy) and the affiliated local cooperative banks.

New legislation (Cooperative Law) enacted in 1920 provided a unified framework for the cooperative banks from the various prior partitions. Three nationwide associations of cooperatives emerged: the Zjednoczenia Związków Spółdzielni Rolniczych (ZZSR, lit. 'Association of Agricultural Cooperative Unions'), established by Stefczyk in 1924, served by the CKSR as a central financing entity; the Unia Związków Spółdzielczych (UZS, lit. 'Union of Cooperative Unions'), successor of the pre-war ZSZiG, served by the BZSZ; and the Związek Spółdzielni Spożywców (ZSS, lit. 'Union of Consumer Cooperatives'), formed by the Społem cooperative movement in 1925 and served by the Bank Społem. Following Stefczyk's death in 1929, the Raiffeisen-style banks he had promoted, known until then as spółek oszczędności i pożyczek (SOP, lit. 'savings and loan companies') became referred to as Kasy Stefczyka ("Stefczyk cooperative banks"). In 1934, the UZS and ZZSR were merged into the Związek Spółdzielni Rolniczych i Zarobkowo-Gospodarczych Rzeczypospolitej Polskiej (ZSRiZG, lit. 'Union of Agricultural and Commercial Cooperatives of the Republic of Poland').

During the Occupation of Poland (1939–1945), many cooperative organizations were expropriated, liquidated or went underground in both the German and Soviet occupation zones. In the General Government, the ZSRiZG was downgraded to an auditing body (Związek Rewizyjny spółdzielni). A German-operated banking supervisor (Polish: Urząd Nadzoru Bankowego) tightly controlled the operations of the surviving cooperative banks, whose number dwindled to 1,152 by 1943 and 952 by 1945.

== Communist era ==
Shortly after liberation from German occupation, by decision of 10 June 1945 the CKSR and Bank Społem were merged into Bank Gospodarstwa Spółdzielczego (BGS, lit. 'Bank for the Agricultural Economy'), which when operational in 1946 became the sole central entity for all of Poland's local cooperative banks. A Council of Ministers' decision of 6 April 1946 led to the liquidation of the country's leading private commercial banks, but (with the exception of the BTS in Warsaw) the cooperative banking sector was temporarily spared. By 1948, Poland had 1,485 local cooperative banks in its new borders, serving 447,000 members. The communist authorities, however, distrusted the cooperative movement which remained largely associated with an independent civil society and the Catholic Church.

In 1948–1951, the government expropriated the entire financial sector into a single-tier banking system. In late 1949, 1,256 local cooperatives were transferred to the control of municipal authorities and reorganized as Municipal Cooperative Funds (Gminne Kasy Spółdzielcze, GKS). The state reorganized the Powszechna Kasa Oszczędności (PKO, lit. 'Universal Savings Bank') as a monopoly institution for retail deposits, which GKSs subsequently collected as agents of PKO. The state-owned Bank Rolny (lit. 'Agricultural Bank'), formed from the 1949 liquidation of the former Państwowy Bank Rolny (PBR, lit. 'State Agricultural Bank', itself a 1921 reorganization of the Polski Bank Rolny originally established in Warsaw in 1919), absorbed the BGS and assumed a central organizational, auditing, and financial role over the GKSs. The Bank Rzemiosła i Handlu (lit. 'Bank of Crafts and Trade'), another specialized state-owned bank, absorbed the operations of the BZSZ, which in 1949 had relocated from Poznań to Warsaw.

The centralizing reforms, however, were soon partly reversed. In 1953, the National Bank of Poland took over the central services role to GKSs from the Bank Rolny. Following the Polish October political changes in 1956, some autonomy was restored to the 1,285 local cooperative banks, albeit still under tight central state control; from 1957 they were again referred to as spółdzielnia oszczędnościowo-pożyczkowa or SOPs. in 1964, the SOPs re-established a national entity of their own, the Central Union of SOPs (Centralny Związek SOP).

On 1 July 1975, the central state control over the sector was again tightened. Bank Gospodarki Żywnościowej (BGZ) was created from the merger of the Central Union of SOPs with the still state-owned Bank Rolny, while the SOPs were rebranded as cooperative banks (banki spółdzielcze). At its inception, BGZ was jointly owned by 1,663 local cooperative banks, together holding 46 percent of its equity capital, and by the State Treasury which held 54 percent. Initially, BGZ had a hands-on mandate and made or approved strategic banking decisions for the local cooperative banks. In 1982, in yet another swing of the political pendulum, new legislation gave back limited autonomy to Poland's cooperative banks, which were to deposit their excess funds at BGZ Bank.

== Post-Communist transition and aftermath ==
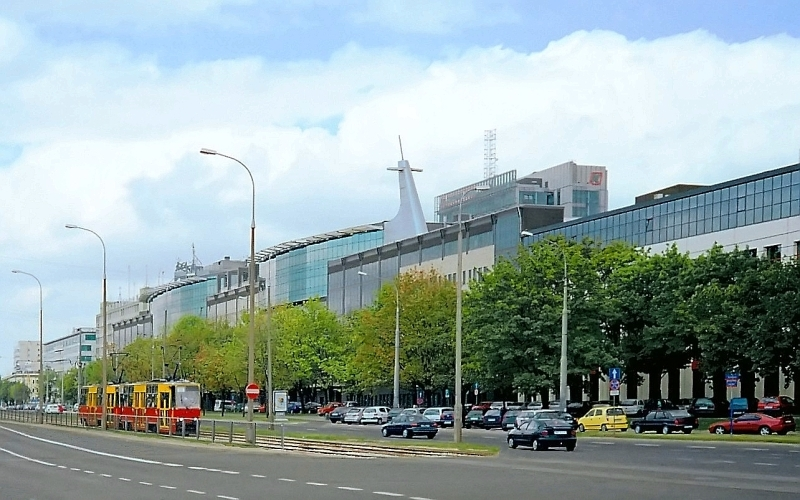
Head office of BGZ Bank in the Wola district of Warsaw, photographed in 2005

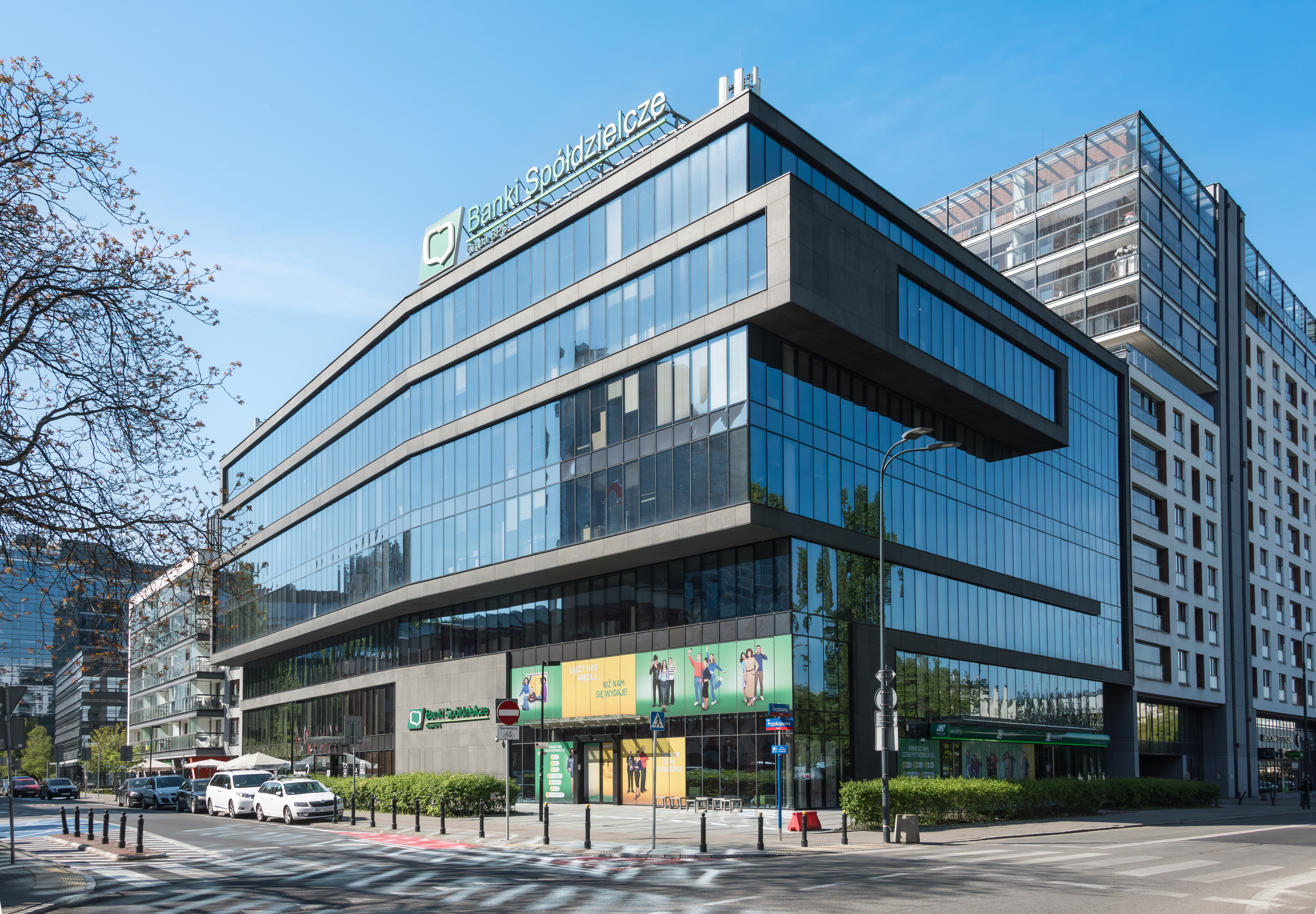
Head office of BPS Group in Warsaw, 2016

By late 1989, there were 1,663 cooperative banks in Poland; their number would then gradually decline due to individual failures and ongoing consolidation. In the wake of the Balcerowicz Plan or "shock therapy", the Cooperative Act of 20 January 1990 deprived BGZ of its statutory role as their auditing organization and allowed individual local cooperative banks to associate themselves on a voluntary basis with a central financial entity known as "affiliating bank" (bank zrzeszający). Following the reform, BGZ was soon competing for that role with newly created affiliating banks such as Gospodarczy Bank Wielkopolski (GBW, est. 1990 in Poznań), Bank Unii Gospodarczej (BUG, est. 1991 in Warsaw), and Gospodarczy Bank Południowo-Zachodni (GBPZ, est. 1992 in Wrocław). In March 1991, the Krajowy Związek Banków Spółdzielczych (lit. 'National Association of Cooperative Banks') was established as the sector's new representative body. In 1992, of Poland's 1,651 local cooperative banks, the vast majority (1,268, or 77 percent) were still affiliated with BGZ, 11 percent (187) with GBPZ, 7 percent (114) with GBW, and 5 percent (82) with BUG.

In 1994, in a context of financial stress in the cooperative banking sector, BGZ was converted into a joint-stock company, with the state retaining 66 percent of its equity and the local cooperative banks owning the remaining 34 percent. That same year, BGZ Bank's brokerage arm was the first brokerage authorized by the Polish Securities Commission. In 1997, BGZ Bank opened a representative office in Moscow.

In the late 1990s and early 2000s, BGZ was gradually marginalized as an affiliating organization of local cooperative banks as the latter increasingly opted for alternative groups formed first through loose alliances of competing affiliating banks, then by mergers. By end-1996, the number of local cooperative banks affiliated with BGZ had decreased to 518, followed by 199 with Lubelski Bank Regionalny (LBR, est. 1995 in Lublin), 173 with GBPZ, 153 with GBW, 137 with Warmińsko-Mazurski Bank Regionalny (WMBR, est. 1995 in Olsztyn), 111 with Pomorsko-Kujawski Bank Regionalny (PKBR, in Bydgoszcz), and 102 with BUG. A "G-2" group was then formed by Poznań-based GBW with Bałtycki Bank Regionalny (BBR) in Koszalin, while Wrocław-based GBPZ led a rival "G-6" group formed together with BUG, LBR, WMBR, Małopolski Bank Regionalny (MBR, in Kraków), and Rzeszowski Bank Regionalny (RBR, in Rzeszów). GBW subsequently absorbed its G-2 partner BBR in 2001, then PKBR in 2002. On 15 March 2002, GBPZ absorbed its G-6 partners to form Bank Polskiej Spółdzielczości, or Bank BPS, by then the affiliating bank of a group that brought together 369 (61 percent) of Poland's 604 local cooperative banks.

By November 2004, the Polish state still owned 69 percent of BGZ Bank, the rest being held by cooperative and affiliating banks. On 6 December 2004, Rabobank acquired a 13.8 percent stake, while the European Bank for Reconstruction and Development acquired a 15 percent stake. On 3 January 2005, Rabobank raised its stake to 35.3 percent by buying out the other cooperative banks, and also acquired the EBRD's stake in 2008.

In 2011, GBW absorbed Mazowiecki Bank Regionalny (MBR, est. 1996 in Warsaw) and rebranded itself as Spółdzielcza Grupa Bankowa, or SGB Bank. Since then, the cooperative banking sector in Poland has been dominated by the two rival networks, BPS Group and SGB Group. Those local banks that have chosen to join neither have been decreasing in number; by mid-2025 they were Bank Spółdzielczy w Brodnicy in Brodnica, Bank Spółdzielczy w Bydgoszczy in Bydgoszcz, Wschodni Bank Spółdzielczy w Chełmie in Chełm, Krakowski Bank Spółdzielczy and Bank Spółdzielczy Rzemiosła w Krakowie in Kraków, Warmińsko-Mazurski Bank Spółdzielczy in Olsztyn, and Bank Spółdzielczy w Rutce – Tartak in Suwałki. The total number of local cooperative banks kept gradually decreasing from 576 in 2010 to 561 in 2015, 530 in 2020, and 489 in 2024. In addition, the Spółdzielcza kasa oszczędnościowo-kredytowa or Polish credit unions formed a separate group of mostly very small local entities.

== See also ==
- List of banks in Poland
- List of European cooperative banks
- German Cooperative Financial Group
