= List of banks in Poland =

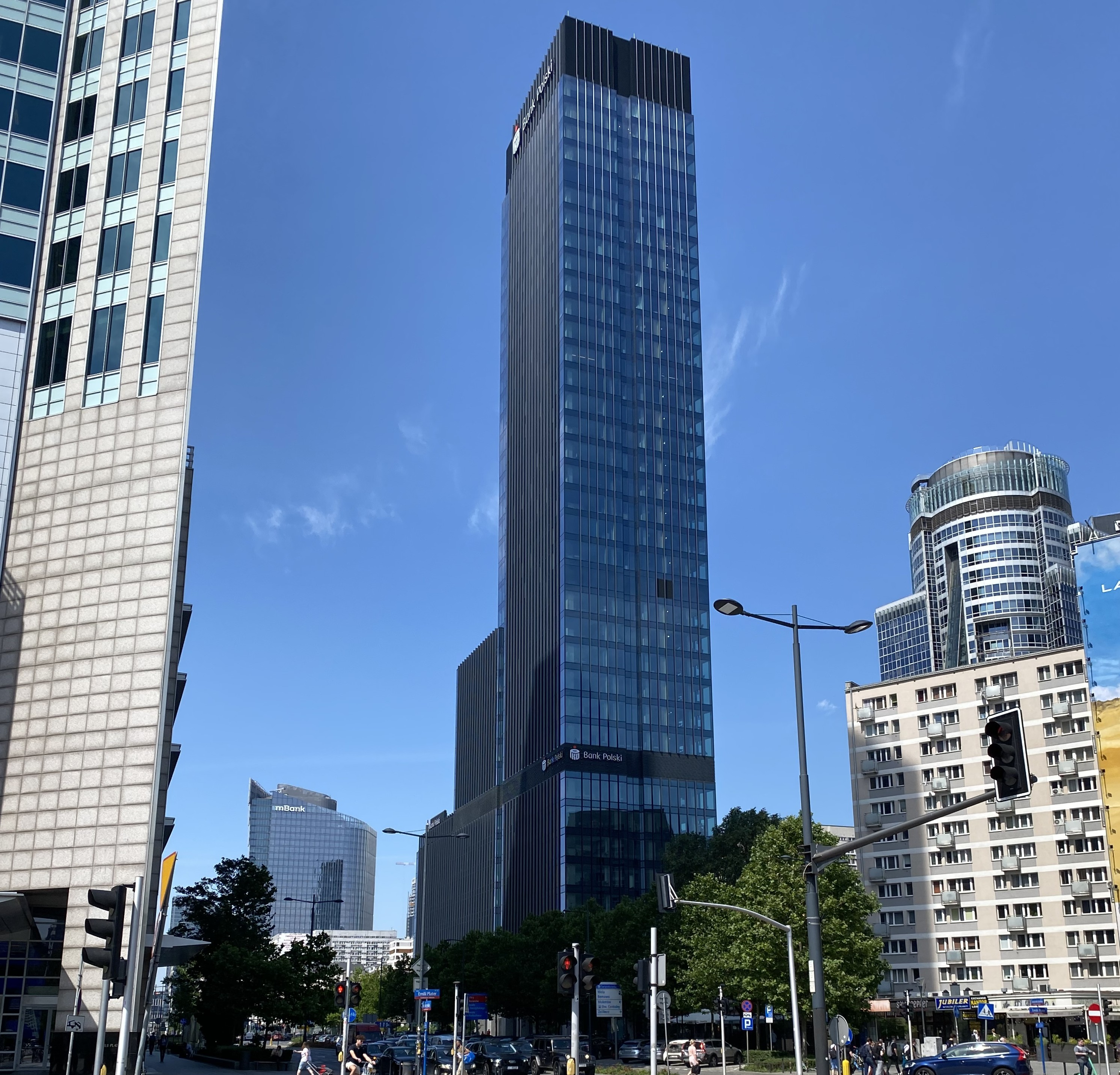
PKO Bank Polski head office, Warsaw

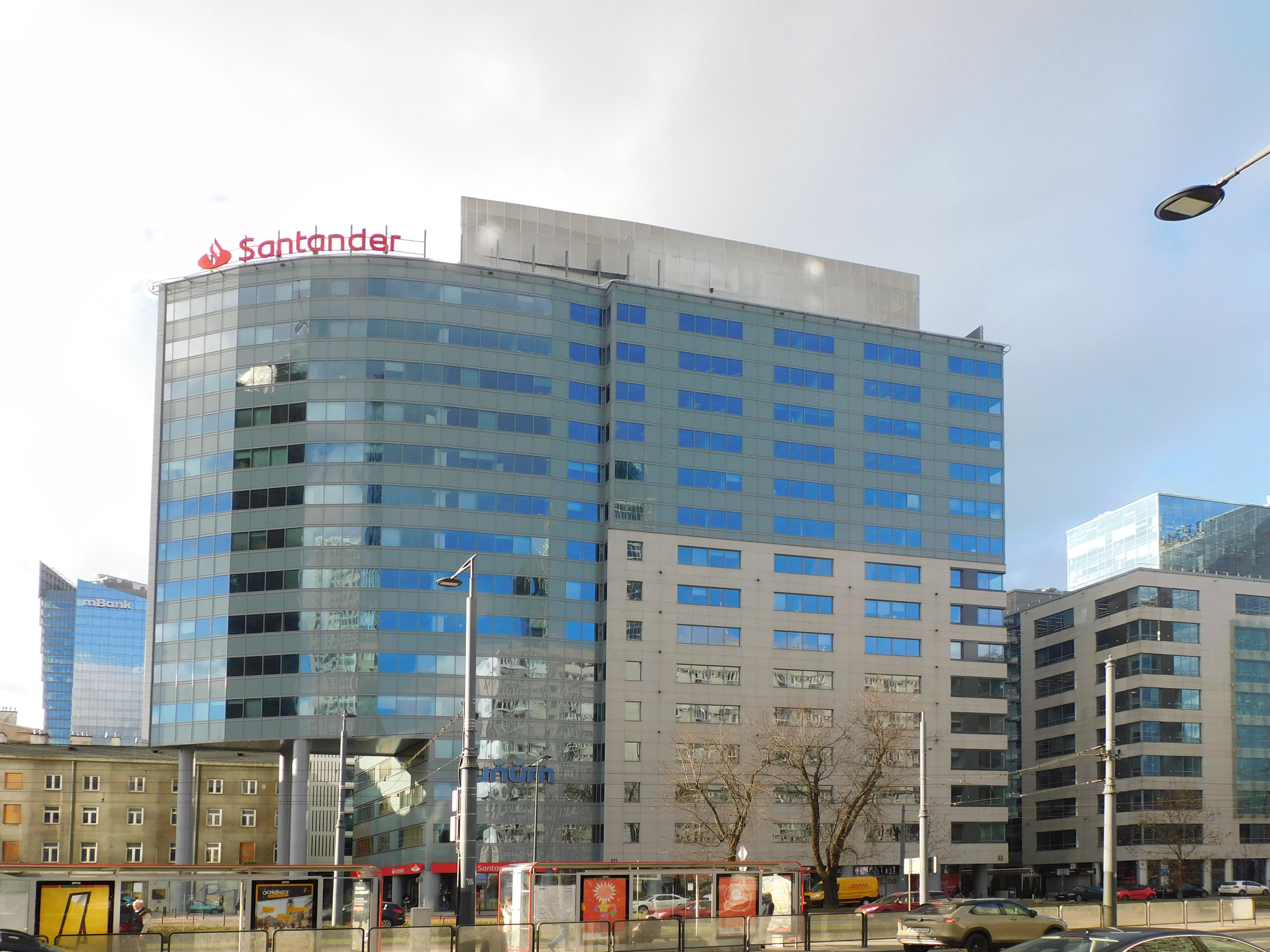
Santander Polska head office, Warsaw

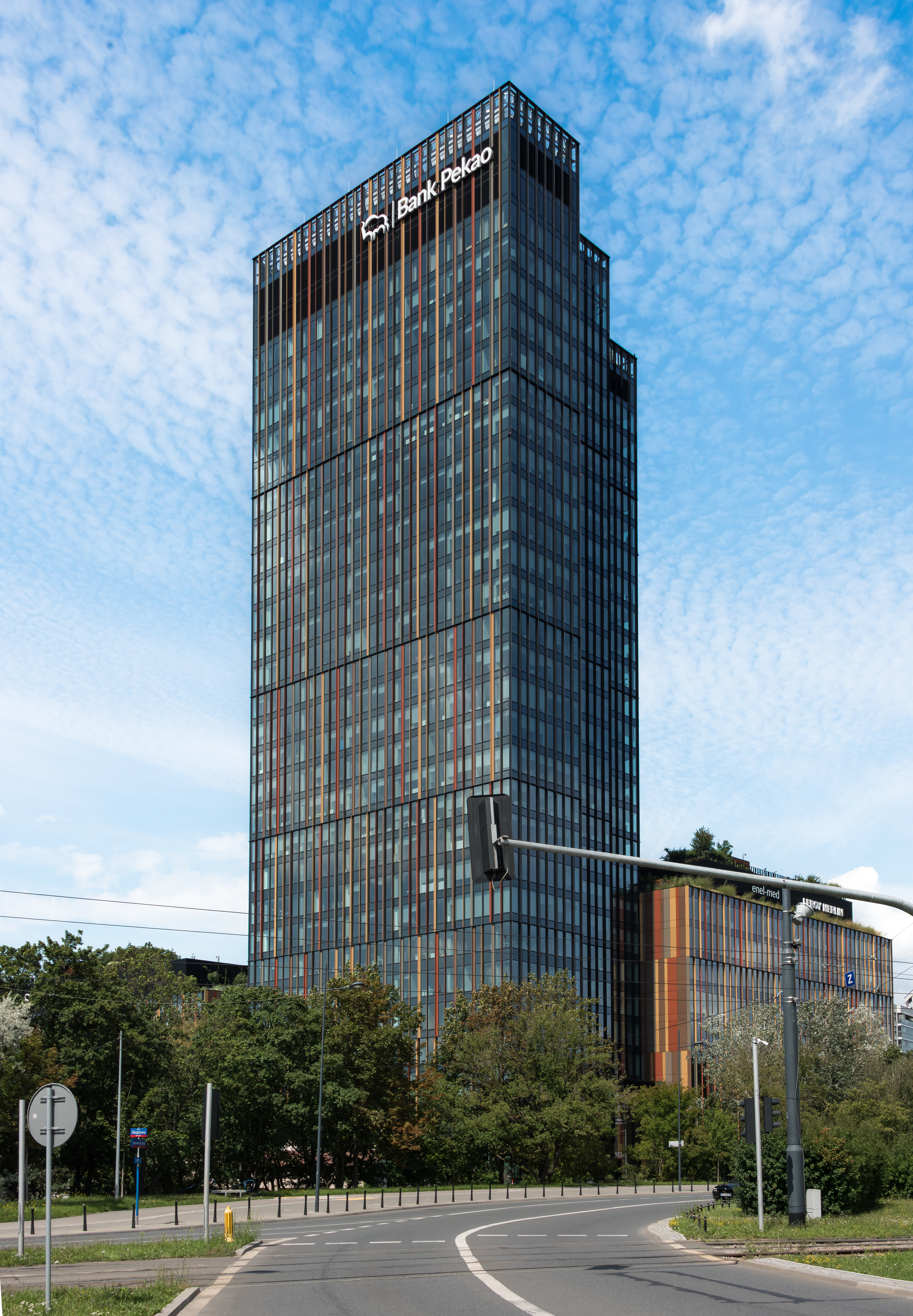
Bank Pekao head office, Warsaw

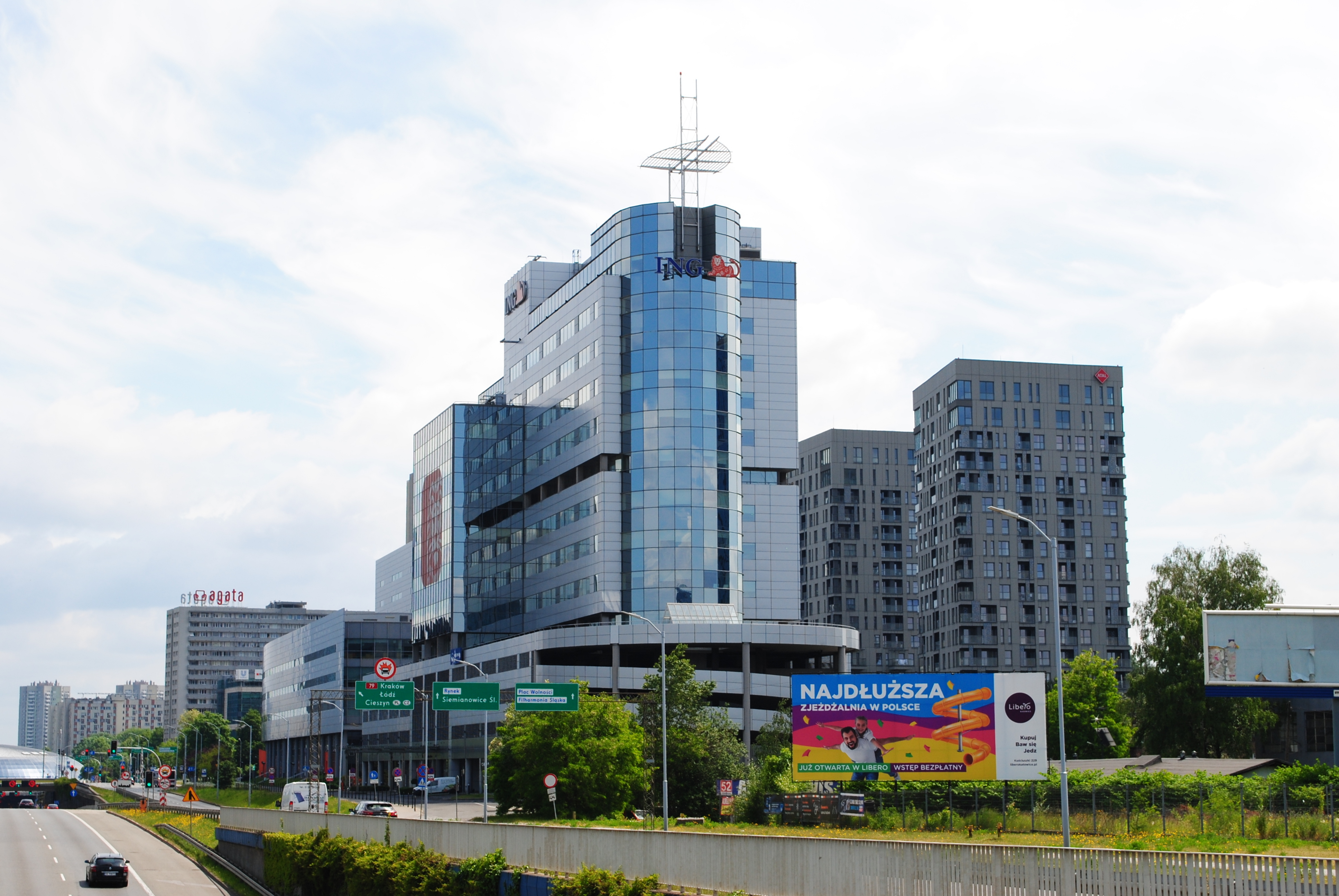
ING Poland head office, Katowice

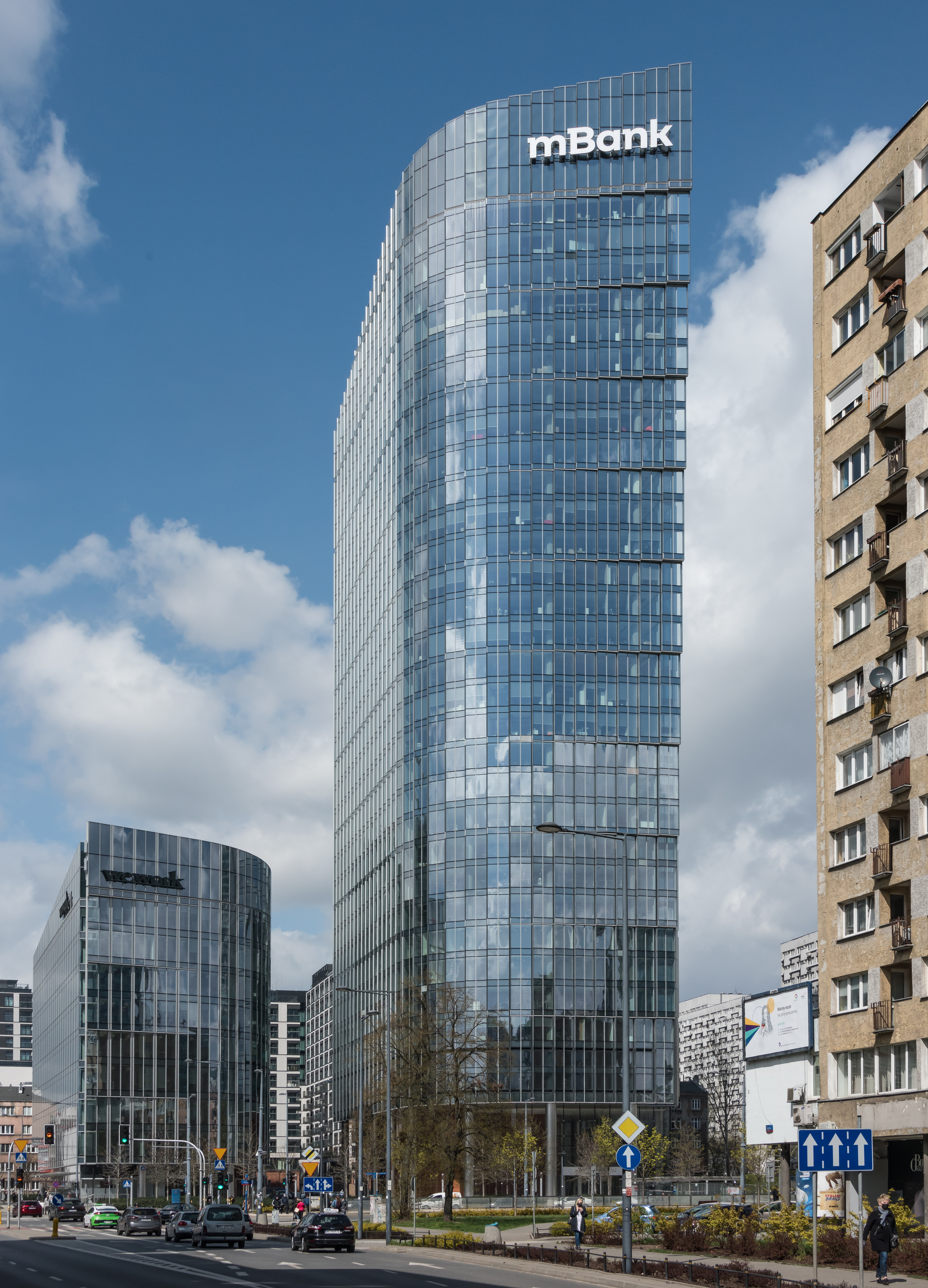
mBank head office, Warsaw

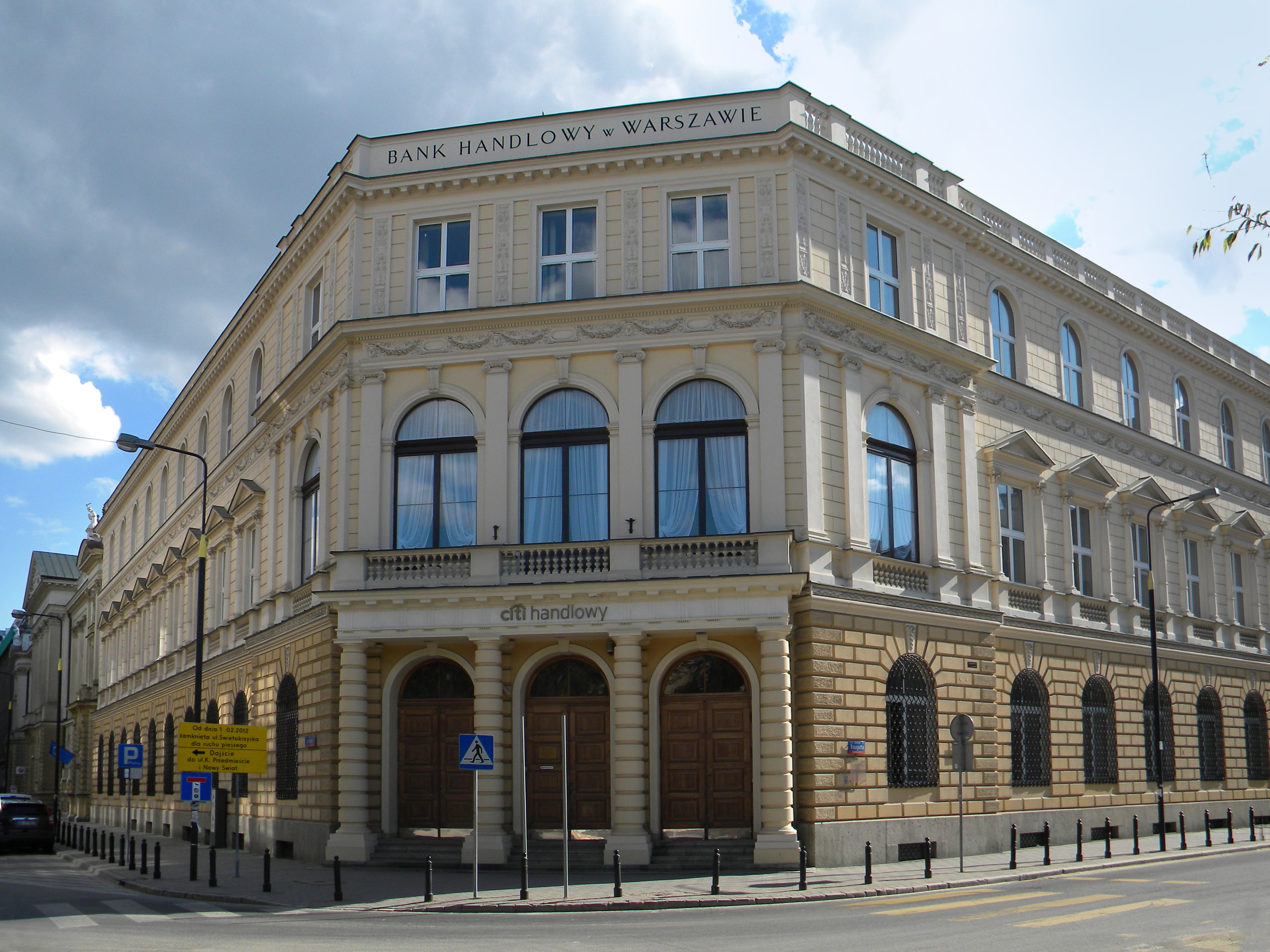
Bank Handlowy head office, Warsaw

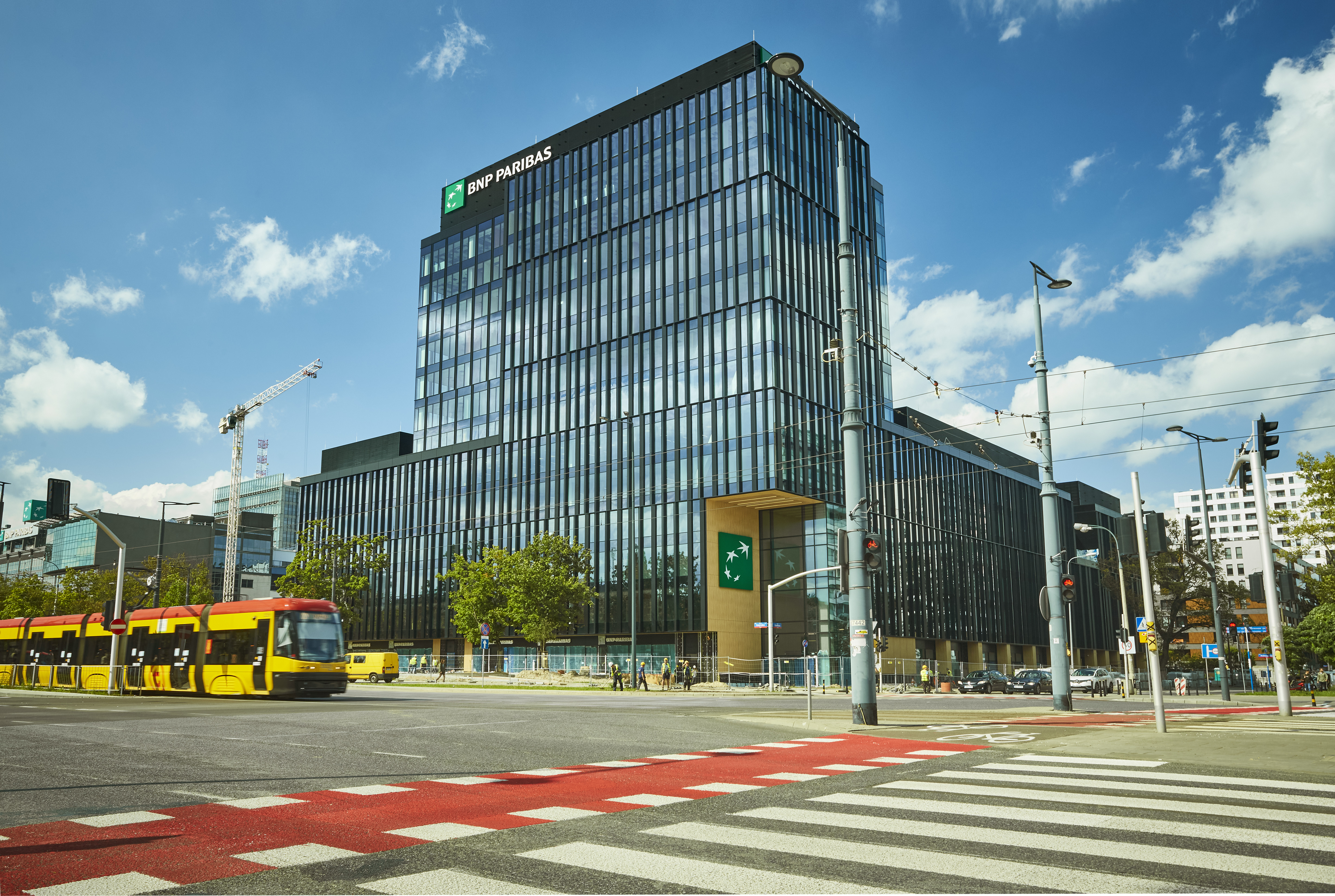
BNP Paribas head office, Warsaw

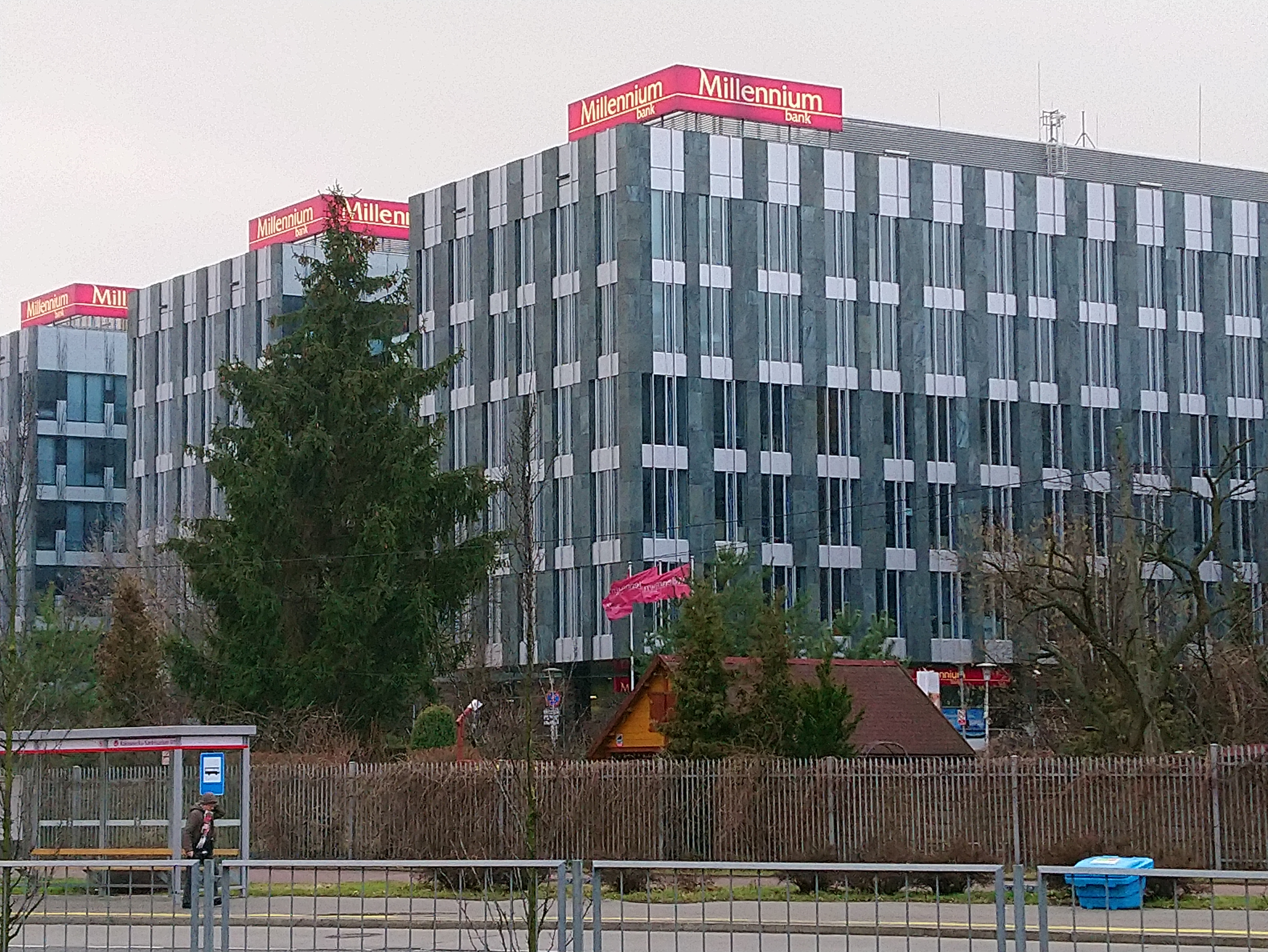
Bank Millennium head office, Warsaw

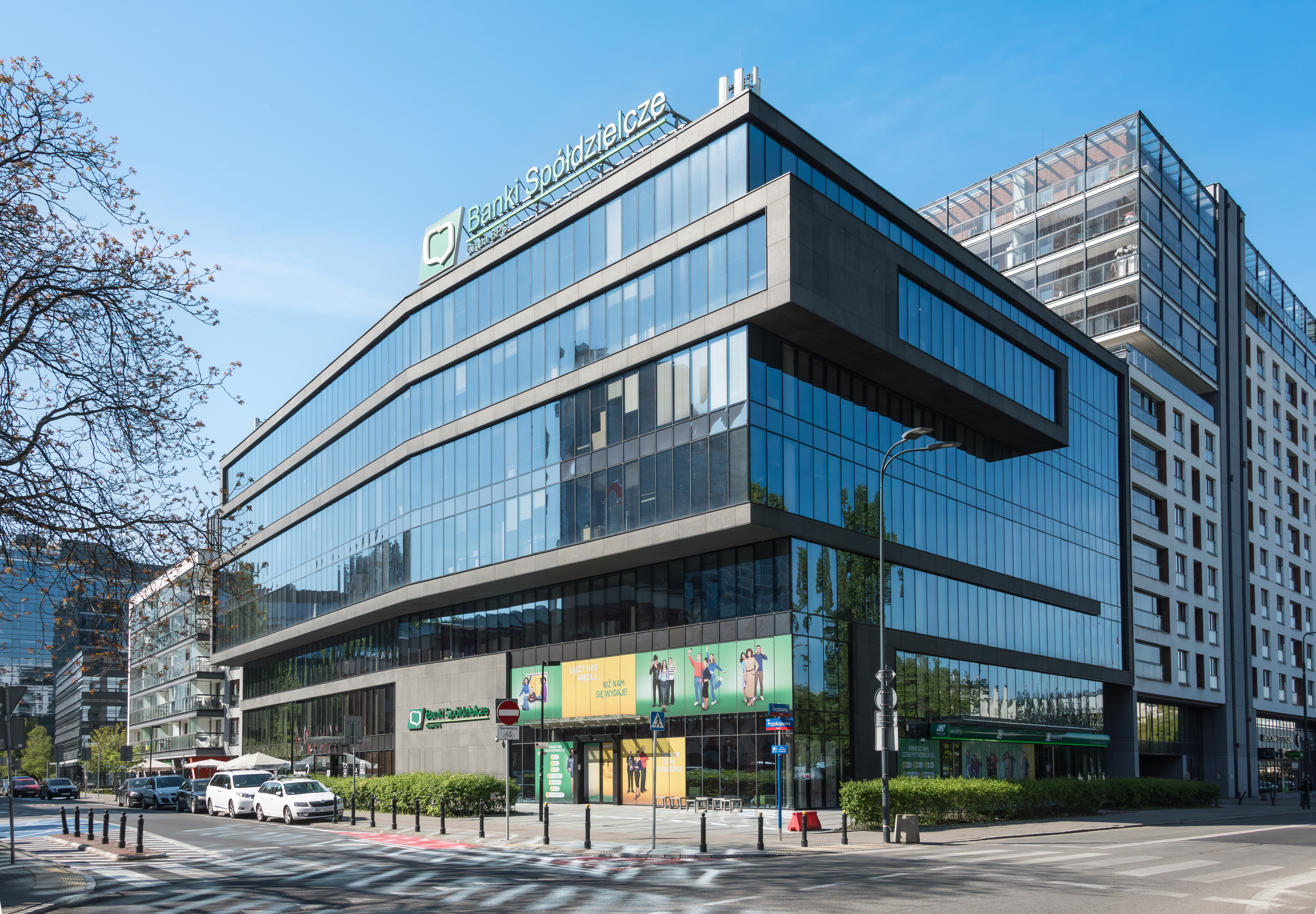
BPS Group head office, Warsaw

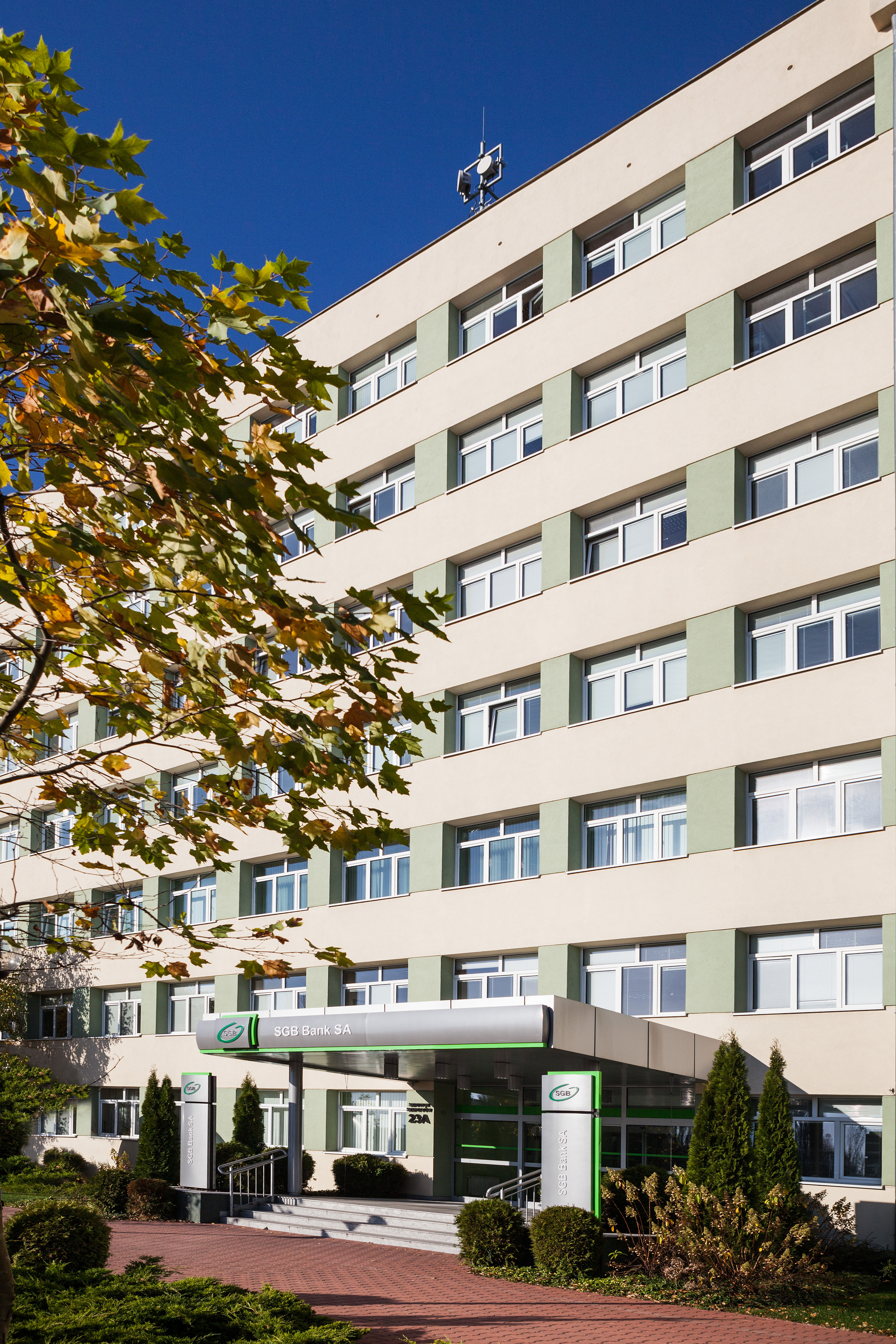
SGB Group head office, Poznań

The following list of banks in Poland is to be understood within the framework of the European single market, which means that Poland's banking system is more open to cross-border banking operations than peers outside of the European Union. It is based on the register of supervised entities maintained by the Polish Financial Supervision Authority (KNF), as of 9 March 2026.

The country's central bank is the National Bank of Poland.

== Recent developments ==
As of early 2026, total assets of Poland's banking sector reached approximately PLN 3.0–3.1 trillion, reflecting continued growth of the financial system. The ten largest banking groups account for a significant share of total assets, indicating a relatively high level of market concentration.

The National Bank of Poland (NBP) is not under KNF's supervision. Bank Gospodarstwa Krajowego (BGK), a state-owned development bank, is under KNF supervision under Polish law but is specifically exempted from the EU Capital Requirements Directives.

== Systemically important banks ==
As of 2025, KNF had designated the following Polish banks as systemically important, listed here by decreasing score of systemic importance:

- Powszechna Kasa Oszczędności Bank Polski SA (known as PKO Bank Polski or PKO BP), 31-percent-owned by the Polish state directly (29%) and via BGK (2%)
- Erste Bank Polska SA, 49-percent-owned by Erste Group since January 2026
- Bank Polska Kasa Opieki SA (known as Bank Pekao), 33-percent-owned by the Polish state via PZU (20%) and PFR (13%)
- ING Bank Śląski SA, majority-owned by ING Group
- mBank SA, majority-owned by Commerzbank
- Bank Handlowy w Warszawie SA, majority-owned by Citigroup
- BNP Paribas Bank Polska SA, majority-owned by BNP Paribas
- Bank Millennium SA, majority-owned by Banco Comercial Português
- Bank Polskiej Spółdzielczości SA, central entity of the cooperative BPS Group
- SGB-Bank SA, central entity of the cooperative SGB Group

Each of the latter two cooperative banking groups, BPS and SGB, relies on an institutional protection scheme.

== Other joint-stock banks ==
Based on the KNF's register of "banks operating as joint-stock companies":

- Alior Bank SA, 32-percent-owned by PZU
- Bank BPH SA, legacy mortgage arm of Alior Bank
- Bank Nowy SA, majority-owned by the Wielkopolski Cooperative Bank
- Bank Ochrony Środowiska SA (BOŚ), majority-owned by the National Fund for Environmental Protection and Water Management
- Bank Pocztowy SA, majority-owned by Polish Post
- Credit Agricole Bank Polska SA, majority-owned by Crédeit Agricole
- Deutsche Bank Polska SA, majority-owned by Deutsche Bank
- DNB Bank Polska SA, majority-owned by DNB Bank
- Getin Noble Bank SA, under liquidation since 2023
- IBK Bank Polska SA, majority-owned by Industrial Bank of Korea
- ING Bank Hipoteczny SA, mortgage arm of ING Bank Śląski
- mBank Hipoteczny SA, mortgage arm of mBank
- Millennium Bank Hipoteczny SA, mortgage arm of Bank Millennium
- Nest Bank SA, fully-owned by AnaCap Financial Partners
- Pekao Bank Hipoteczny SA, mortgage arm of Bank Pekao
- PKO Bank Hipoteczny SA, mortgage arm of PKO BP
- Plus Bank SA, affiliated with Grupa Polsat Plus
- Santander Consumer Bank SA, fully-owned by Banco Santander
- Toyota Bank Polska SA, subsidiary of Toyota via Toyota Kreditbank
- VeloBank SA, majority-owned by Cerberus Capital Management

== Cooperative banks ==
Poland has a long tradition of cooperative banking. As of early 2026, the KNF register included 488 cooperative banks (Polish: Bank Spółdzielczy), the vast majority of which were members of either the BPS Group or the SGB Group. The remaining independent local cooperative banks were:

- Bank Spółdzielczy w Brodnicy in Brodnica
- Bank Spółdzielczy w Bydgoszczy in Bydgoszcz
- Wschodni Bank Spółdzielczy w Chełmie in Chełm
- Krakowski Bank Spółdzielczy and Bank Spółdzielczy Rzemiosła w Krakowie in Kraków
- Warmińsko-Mazurski Bank Spółdzielczy in Olsztyn
- Bank Spółdzielczy w Rutce – Tartak in Suwałki

== Credit Unions ==
Polish credit unions (Polish: spółdzielcza kasa oszczędnościowo-kredytowa) are under a separate framework from cooperative banks, and are exempted from the EU Capital Requirements Directives. At end-2023, there were 18 such Polish credit unions with total assets of ca. US$2.7 billion.

== Foreign branches ==
Based on the KNF's register of "branches of credit institutions":

- (Germany) Aareal Bank AG
- (Spain) Allfunds Bank SAU
- (Estonia) AS Inbank
- (Luxembourg) Bank of China (Europe) SA, subsidiary of Bank of China
- (Italy) BFF Bank SpA
- (France) BNP Paribas SA
- (Italy) CA Auto Bank SpA
- (Spain) CaixaBank SA
- (Luxembourg) China Construction Bank (Europe) SA, subsidiary of China Construction Bank
- (Republic of Ireland) Citibank Europe plc, subsidiary of Citigroup (United States)
- (Denmark) Danske Bank A/S
- (Belgium) Euroclear Bank SA/NV
- (Germany) Goldman Sachs Bank Europe SE, subsidiary of Goldman Sachs (United States)
- (Portugal) Haitong Bank SA, subsidiary of Haitong Securities (China)
- (Sweden) Hoist Finance AB (publ.)
- (France) HSBC Continental Europe, subsidiary of HSBC (United Kingdom)
- (Sweden) Ikano Bank AB (publ.)
- (Luxembourg) Industrial and Commercial Bank of China (Europe) SA, subsidiary of Industrial and Commercial Bank of China
- (Italy) Intesa Sanpaolo SpA
- (Germany) J.P. Morgan SE, subsidiary of JPMorgan Chase (United States)
- (Luxembourg) John Deere Bank SA, subsidiary of John Deere (United States)
- (Germany) KEB Hana Bank (D) AG, subsidiary of Hana Bank (Korea)
- (Germany) Morgan Stanley Europe SE, subsidiary of Morgan Stanley (United States)
- (Finland) Nordea Bank Abp
- (Austria) Raiffeisen Bank International AG
- (France) RCI Banque SA
- (Sweden) Skandinaviska Enskilda Banken AB
- (France) Société Générale SA
- (Sweden) TF Bank AB
- (Germany) Trade Republic Bank GmbH
- (Republic of Ireland) US Bank Europe DAC, subsidiary of U.S. Bancorp (United States)
- (Italy) UniCredit NV/SA
- (Germany) Volkswagen Bank GmbH
- (Austria) Western Union International Bank GmbH, subsidiary of Western Union (United States)
- (Germany) Woori Bank (Europe) GmbH, subsidiary of Woori Bank (Korea)

As of October 2025, there were no branches of banks located outside the European Economic Area ("third-country branches") in Poland, based on data compiled by the European Banking Authority.

== Additional corporate information ==
Name	SWIFT code	Website
Alior Bank S.A.	ABLPPLPW	aliorbank.pl
BNP Paribas Bank Polska S.A.	PPABPLPK	bnpparibas.pl
mBank S.A.	BREXPLPW	mbank.pl
Bank Handlowy w Warszawie S.A.	CITIPLPX	citibank.pl
Bank Millennium S.A.	BIGBPLPW	bankmillennium.pl
Bank Ochrony Środowiska S.A.	EBOSPLPW	bosbank.pl
Bank Pocztowy S.A.	POCZPLP4	pocztowy.pl
Bank Polska Kasa Opieki S.A.	PKOPPLPW	pekao.com.pl
Bank Polskiej Spółdzielczości S.A.	POLUPLPR	bankbps.pl
Crédit Agricole Bank Polska S.A.	AGRIPLPR	credit-agricole.pl
Deutsche Bank Polska S.A.	DEUTPLPX	db.com/poland
DNB Bank Polska S.A.	MHBFPLPW	dnb.pl
ING Bank Śląski S.A.	INGBPLPW	ing.pl
Nest Bank S.A.	NESBPLPW	nestbank.pl
Plus Bank S.A.	IVSEPLPP	plusbank.pl
Powszechna Kasa Oszczędności Bank Polski S.A.	BPKOPLPW	pkobp.pl
SGB-Bank S.A.	GBWCPLPP	sgb.pl
Santander Bank Polska S.A.	WBKPPLPP	santander.pl
UniCredit NV/SA	BMPBPLPP	
VeloBank S.A.	GBGCPLPK	
Millennium Bank Hipoteczny S.A.		millenniumbh.pl
Pekao Bank Hipoteczny S.A.	HYVEPLP2	pekaobh.pl
PKO Bank Hipoteczny S.A.	BPKHPLPG	pkobh.pl
ING Bank Hipoteczny S.A.	INGBPLPH	inghipoteczny.pl
Santander Consumer Bank S.A.	SCFBPLPW	santanderconsumer.pl
mBank Hipoteczny S.A.	RHBHPLPW	mhipoteczny.pl
Bank Nowy BFG S.A.	POLUPLPR	banknowybfg.pl
Toyota Bank Polska S.A.	TOBAPLPW	toyotabank.pl

== Defunct banks ==
=== Headquartered on the territory of present-day Poland ===
- Schlesische Landschaft (1770–1945)
- Pommersche Landschaft (1781–1945)
- Ritterschaftliche Privatbank in Pommern (1824–1877)
- Bank Polski (1828–1885)
- Städtische Bank in Breslau (1848–1910)
- Schlesischer Bankverein (1856–1917)
- Provinzial-Aktienbank des Großherzogtums Posen (1857–1929), known from 1898 as Ostbank für Handel und Gewerbe
- Bank of Industrialists (1861–1933)
- Galician Bank for Trade and Industry (1869–1929)
- Związek Spółek Zarobkowych i Gospodarczych (1871–1950)
- Commercial Bank in Poznań (1872–1939)
- Silesian Discount Bank (1893–1931)
- Bank Towarzystw Spółdzielczych (1909–1946)
- Bank for Trade and Industry in Warsaw (1910–1932)
- Polish Industrial Bank (1910–1933)
- Bank Dyskontowy (1913–1927)
- Polish National Loan Bank (1916–1924)
- Land Bank for the Borderlands (1918–1927)
- Polish Land Bank in Lublin (1918–1926)
- Bank Kredytu Hipotecznego (1919–1928)
- Państwowy Bank Rolny (1919–1948)
- Bank of Polish Industrialists (1920–1928)
- Bank of the Mechanics Association (1920–1925)
- Banque Franco-Polonaise (1920–1963)
- Cooperative Bank at the Jewish Craftsmen's Club (1920–1923)
- Warsaw Capital Bank (1920–1925)
- Bank for the Electrification of Poland (1921–1925)
- Kalisz Land Bank (1921–1935)
- Polish Emigration Bank (1921–1924)
- Polish Commission Bank (1921–1924)
- Sugar Bank (1921–1946)
- Warsaw United Bank (1921–1926)
- Bank Śląski – Banque de Silésie (1922–1934)
- Bank Polski SA (1924–1952)
- Belarusian Cooperative Bank (1925–1938)
- British and Polish Trade Bank (1926–1939)
- Bank of Issue in Poland (1940–1945)
- Bank Inwestycyjny (1948-1970)
- Bank Rolny (1950–1975)
- Centralny Związek SOP (1964–1975)
- Bank Gospodarki Żywnościowej (1975–2019)
- Bank Rozwoju Eksportu (1987-2013)
- Bank Depozytowo-Kredytowy (1989-1999)
- Bank Gdański (1989-1997)
- Bank Inicjatyw Gospodarczych (1989-1997)
- Bank Przemysłowo-Handlowy (1989-2001)
- Bank Śląski (1989-2001)
- Bank Zachodni (1989–2001)
- Pomorski Bank Kredytowy (1989-1999)
- Powszechny Bank Gospodarczy (1989-1999)
- Powszechny Bank Kredytowy (1989-2001)
- Wielkopolski Bank Kredytowy (1989–2001)
- Getin Bank (1990–2022)
- Kredyt Bank (1990-2013)
- Polski Bank Rozwoju (1990-1998)
- Idea Bank (1991–2021)
- Nordea Bank Polska (1992–2010)
- Mercedes-Benz Bank Polska (1999–2021)
- Bank Zachodni-WBK (2001–2018)
- Bank BPH-PBK (2001-2009)
- Inteligo (2001–2024)
- Euro Bank (2003–2019)
- HSBC Bank Polska (2003–2019)
- Santander Bank Polska (2018-2026)

=== Headquartered on former Polish territory ===
- Mons Pius Bank in Lviv (1788–1939)
- Joint-stock Mortgage Bank of Lviv (1867–1918)
- Vilnius Land Bank (1872–1939)
- Bank Krajowy in Lviv (1881–1924)
- Land Credit Bank in Lviv (1909–1930)
- Land Mortgage Bank in Lviv (1910–1939)

== See also ==
- List of Polish companies
- List of banks in Europe
