= BGZ Bank =

Former Polish bank

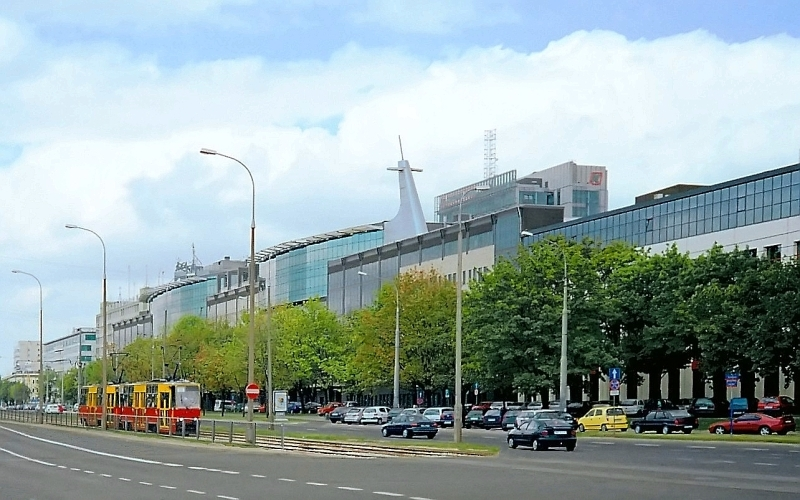
- Head office of BGZ Bank in the Wola district of Warsaw, photographed in 2005
- Native name: Bank Gospodarki Żywnościowej
- Company type: Public company
- Traded as: GPW : BGZ
- ISIN: PLBGZ0000010
- Industry: Financial services
- Founded: 1975
- Defunct: 2015
- Fate: Acquired
- Successor: BNP Paribas Bank Polska
- Headquarters: Warsaw, Poland
- Area served: Poland
- Products: Universal banking
- Owner: BNP Paribas
- Website: bgz.pl at the Wayback Machine (archived February 8, 2014)

BGZ Bank (Polish: Bank BGŻ), for Bank Gospodarki Żywnościowej (lit. 'Bank of the agricultural economy'), was a significant bank in Poland based in Warsaw.

BGZ was created in 1975 by merger of two pre-existing financial institutions supporting Poland's agricultural and cooperative banking sector. In Poland's post-communist transition, BGZ Bank grew as a commercial bank while its role as a national entity serving local cooperative banks was gradually eroded to the benefit of competing entities, resulting in the formation of the BPS Group and SGB Group.

In 2015, BGZ Bank was acquired by BNP Paribas which renamed it Bank BGŻ BNP Paribas. The BGŻ brand was finally terminated in 2019 when the entity became BNP Paribas Bank Polska.

== History ==
=== Communist era ===
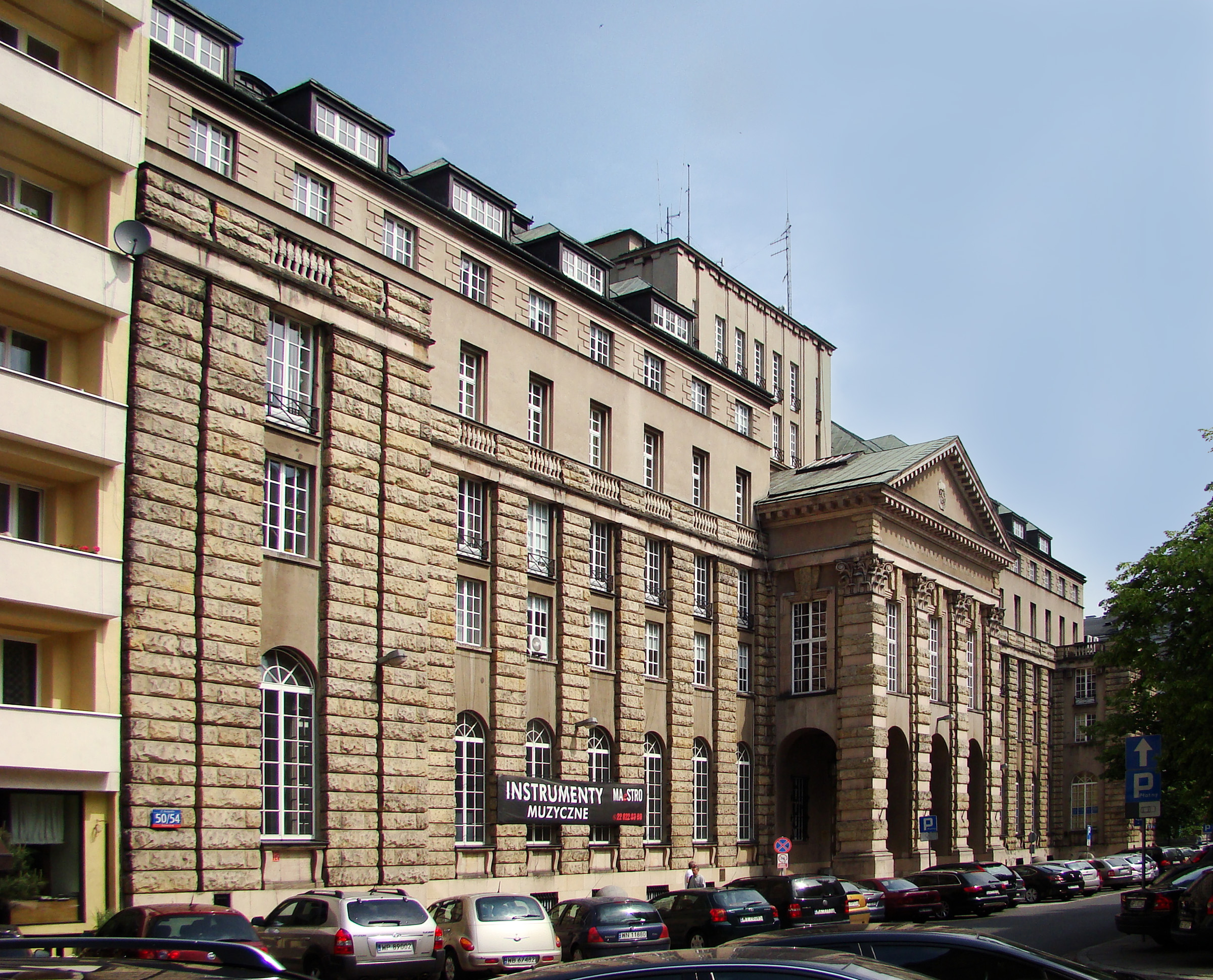
Former head office of Bank Rolny in Warsaw, one of the predecessor entities of BGZ Bank, designed by architect Marian Lalewicz and completed in 1927

On 1 July 1975, Bank Gospodarki Żywnościowej was created from the merger of the Central Union of Polish Savings and Loan Cooperatives with the state-owned Bank Rolny. At its inception, BGZ was jointly owned by 1,663 local cooperative banks, together holding 46 percent of its equity capital, and by the State Treasury which held 54 percent.

Initially, BGZ had a hands-on mandate and made or approved strategic banking decisions for the local cooperative banks. In 1982, in yet another swing of the political pendulum, new legislation gave back some autonomy to Poland's cooperative banks, which were to deposit their excess funds at BGZ Bank.

=== Post-Communist transition ===
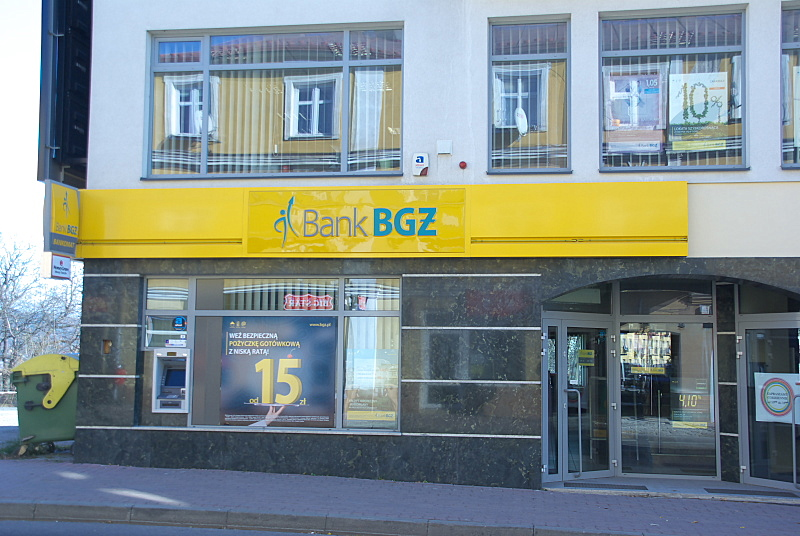
A branch of BGŻ Bank in Sanok, 2011

The Cooperative Act of 20 January 1990 deprived BGZ of its statutory role as their auditing organization and allowed individual local cooperative banks to associate themselves on a voluntary basis with a central financial entity known as "affiliating bank" (bank zrzeszający). Following the reform, BGZ was soon competing for that role with newly created affiliating banks such as Gospodarczy Bank Wielkopolski (GBW, est. 1990 in Poznań) and Bank Unii Gospodarczej (BUG, est. 1991 in Warsaw), then Gospodarczy Bank Południowo-Zachodni (GBPZ, est. 1992 in Wrocław). In 1992, of Poland's 1,651 local cooperative banks, the vast majority (1,268, or 77 percent) were still affiliated with BGZ, 11 percent (187) with GBPZ, 7 percent (114) with GBW, and 5 percent (82) with BUG.

In 1994, in a context of financial stress in the cooperative banking sector, BGZ was converted into a joint-stock company, with the state retaining 66 percent of its equity and the local cooperative banks owning the remaining 34 percent. That same year, BGZ Bank's brokerage arm was the first brokerage authorized by the Polish Securities Commission. In 1997, BGZ Bank opened a representative office in Moscow. In the late 1990s and early 2000s, the marginalization of BGZ as an affiliating organization was accelerated by the formation of alternative groups, first through loose alliances then by mergers of other affiliated banks.

=== Acquisition by Rabobank ===
By November 2004, the Polish state still owned 69 percent of BGZ Bank, the rest being held by affiliating banks of the Polish cooperative sector such as Bank BPS or Mazowiecki Bank Regionalny (MBR, est. 1996 in Warsaw). On 6 December 2004, Rabobank acquired a 13.8 percent stake, while the European Bank for Reconstruction and Development acquired a 15 percent stake. On 3 January 2005, Rabobank raised its stake to 35.3 percent by buying out the other cooperative banks, and also acquired the EBRD's stake in 2008.

By early July 2011, Rabobank's stake had grown to 59.35 percent while the Polish state owned 37.3 percent. On 13 July 2011, BGZ Bank was floated on the Warsaw Stock Exchange. By end-2011, Rabobank still held 59.35 percent while the state had 25.54 percent, and 15.11 percent was free float. On 17 September 2012, Rabobank increased its share in BGZ Bank to 98.3 percent. By 2013, BGZ Bank had a total staff of 5,538 full-time equivalents.

=== Acquisition by BNP Paribas ===
On 3 December 2013, Rabobank agreed to sell BGZ Bank to BNP Paribas together with its separate Polish subsidiary, Rabobank Polska. BGZ and Rabobank Polska were merged on 18 June 2014, then BGZ absorbed the existing BNP Paribas Bank Polska on 30 April 2015, and issued new shares on the Polish Stock Exchange on 18 May 2015 with BNP Paribas keeping a majority stake.

In 2018, Bank BGZ BNP Paribas acquired the operations of Raiffeisen Bank Polska with support from the EBRD. In 2019, the BGŻ brand was finally terminated and replaced with BNP Paribas Bank Polska.

== Presidents ==
- Alexander Paklons (2007–2010)
- Frederic Amoudru (2010–2013)
- Józef Wancer (2013–2015)

== See also ==
- Cooperative banking in Poland
- Agriculture in Poland
- List of banks in Poland
