= SGB Group =

Polish cooperative banking group

SGB Group - Spółdzielcza Grupa Bankowa
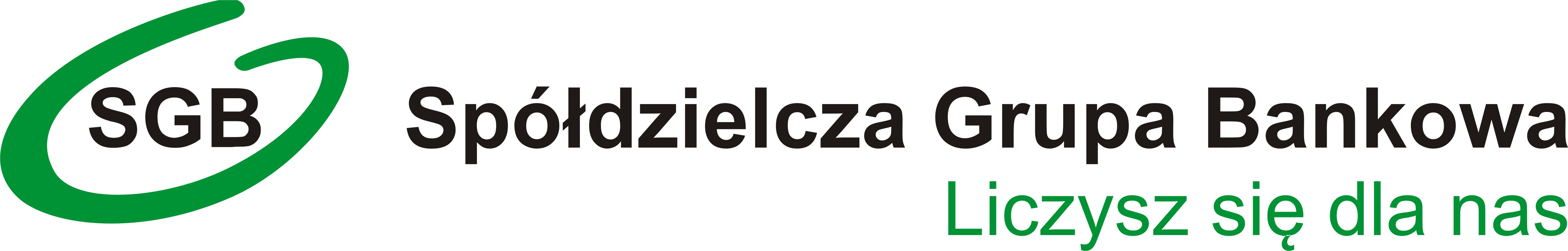

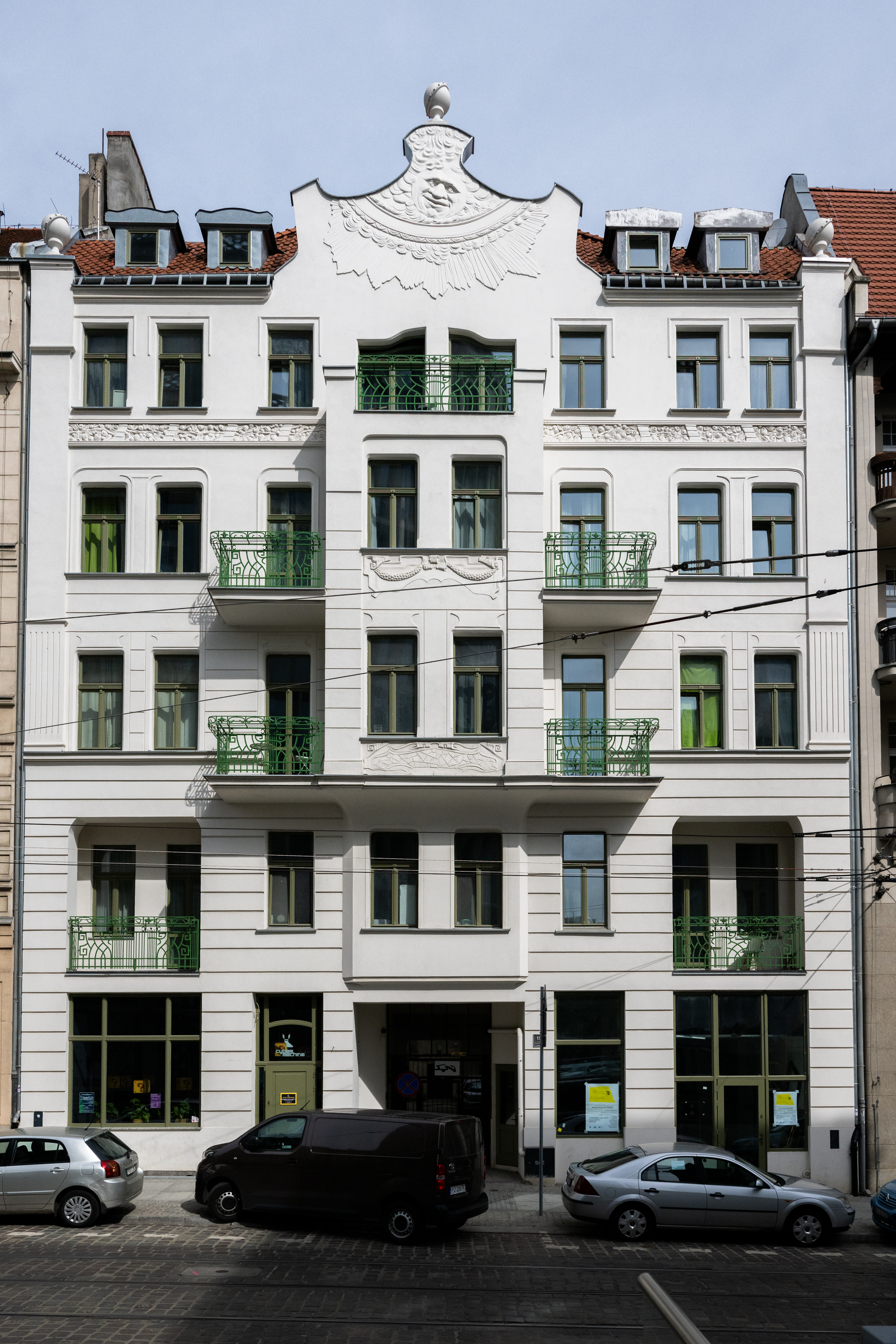
- Building at Mielżyńskiego 22 in Poznań, seat of Gospodarczy Bank Wielkopolski from 1991 to 2010
- Company type: Cooperative
- Industry: Financial services
- Predecessor: Gospodarczy Bank Wielkopolski (GBW)
- Founded: 1990; 36 years ago
- Headquarters: Poznań, Poland
- Area served: Poland
- Products: cooperative banking
- Website: www.sgb.pl

The SGB Group (Polish: Grupa SGB), for Spółdzielcza Grupa Bankowa (lit. 'Cooperative Banking Group'), is the second-largest Polish cooperative banking group behind the BPS Group. It relies on the Poznań-based central financing entity SGB-Bank, which served 174 local cooperative banks as of mid-2025.

The group's origin was the establishment in 1990-1991 of Gospodarczy Bank Wielkopolski (GBW) in Poznań, which renamed itself as SGB-Bank in 2011 following multiple mergers.

== History ==
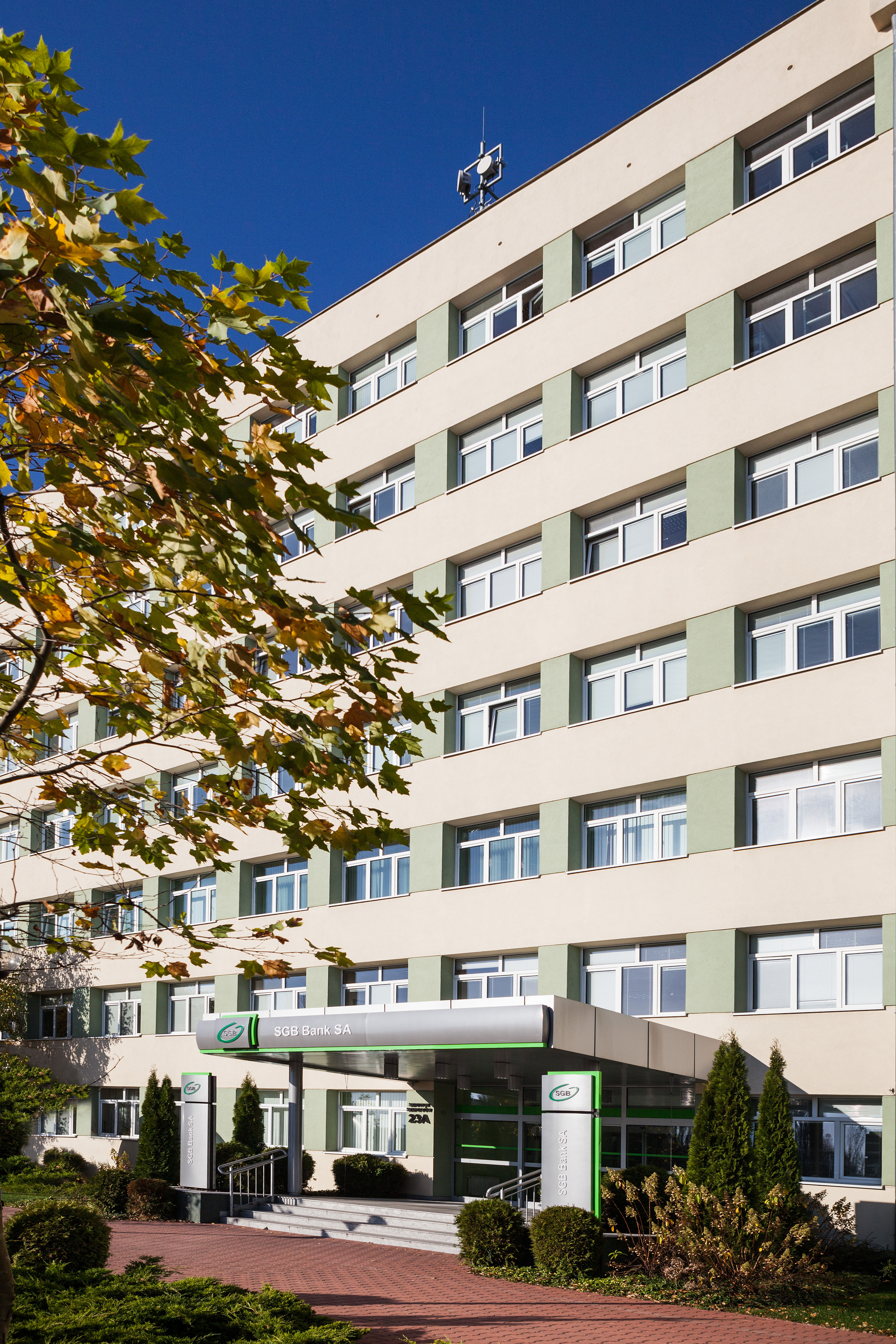
Building at Szarych Szeregów 23a in the outskirts of Poznań, head office of SGB since 2010

GBW was the first of a number of regional banks created in the 1990s to compete with BGZ Bank for the provision of wholesale financial services to local cooperative banks.

By 1993, 117 local cooperative banks had opted to become affiliated with GBW instead of their prior reliance on BGZ Bank for central financial services. France's Crédit Mutuel group became a shareholder of GBW.

By 2000, GBW had formed a so-called "G-2" group together with Bałtycki Bank Regionalny (BBR) in Koszalin, GBW subsequently absorbed its G-2 partner BBR in 2001, then Pomorsko-Kujawski Bank Regionalny in Bydgoszcz in 2002.

In 2011, it acquired Mazowiecki Bank Regionalny (est. 1996 in Warsaw), after which it renamed itself SGB-Bank.

Kazimierz Grześkowiak was the GBW's first president.

The group also includes IPS-SGB, the entity that manages its institutional protection scheme.

== See also ==
- Cooperative banking in Poland
- List of banks in Poland
- List of European cooperative banks
