= Ostbank für Handel und Gewerbe =

Former German bank

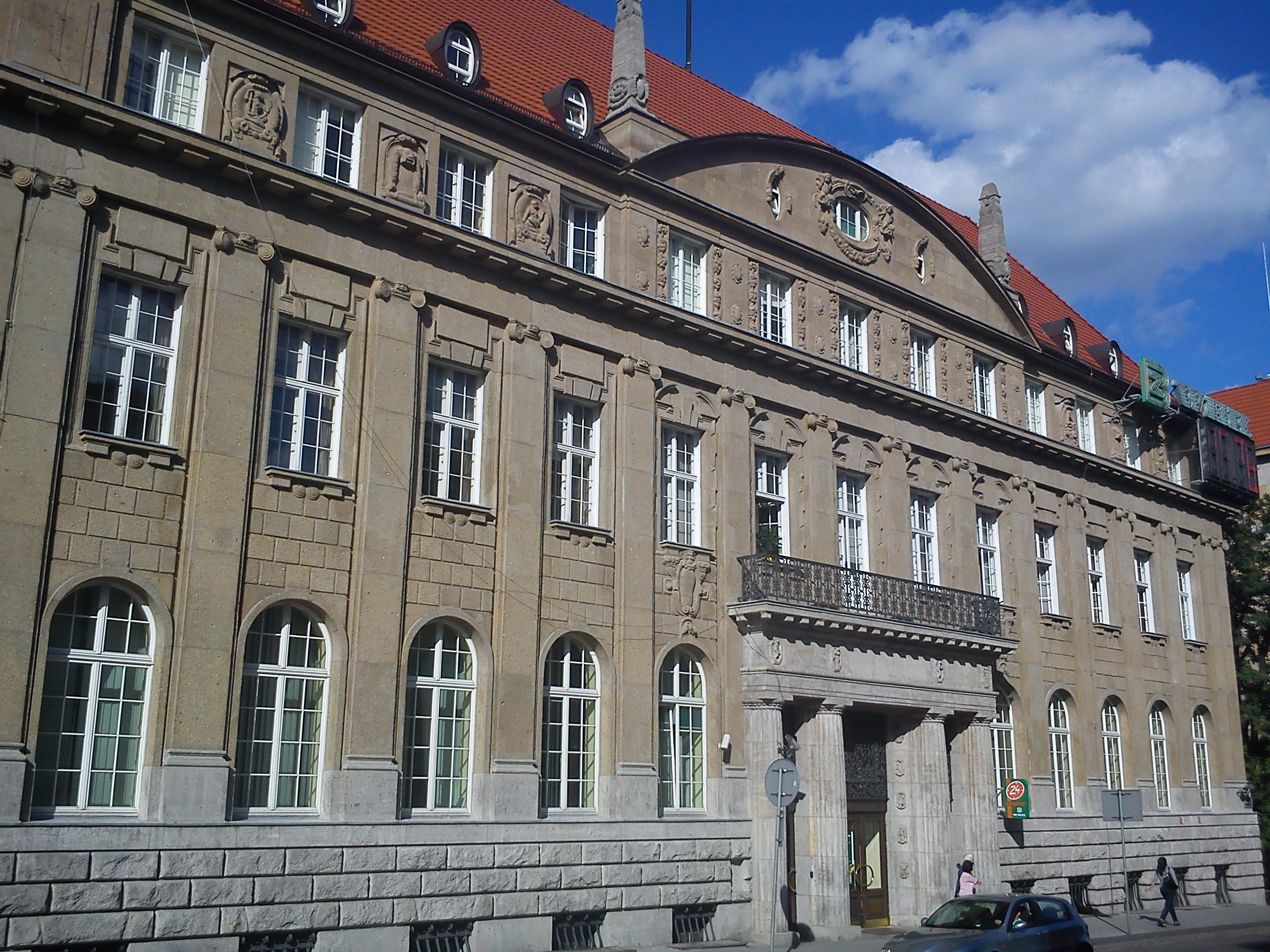
Former head office building of Ostbank für Handel und Gewerbe, 15 Wolności Square in Poznań

The Ostbank für Handel und Gewerbe (lit. 'Eastern Bank for Trade and Industry'), known from its 1857 founding to 1898 as the Provinzial-Aktienbank des Großherzogtums Posen (lit. 'Provincial Joint-Stock Bank of the Grand Duchy of Posen') and later sometimes simply referred to as Ostbank (Polish: Bank Wschodni), was a prominent bank of issue (until 1891) and commercial bank in the eastern part of the German Empire.

Ostbank was disrupted during and after World War I, and eventually absorbed in 1929 by Dresdner Bank. During World War II, Dresdner Bank revived it for its predatory operations in occupied Poland.

== German Empire and World War I ==
The Provinzial-Aktienbank was founded in Posen (now Poznań) on 16 March 1857, following years of preparation and with a privilege to issue banknotes until 1891. This privilege was not renewed as a consequence of the monetary unification under the Reichsbank in the 1870s. The bank subsequently changed its name in 1898, as Ostbank für Handel und Gewerbe. In the years that followed, the Ostbank entered a community of interest with the Darmstädter Bank, one of Germany's dominant large banks.

In August 1905, it merged with Ostdeutsche Bank AG, a peer institution in Königsberg (now Kaliningrad) and subsequently advertised itself as headquartered in both Posen and Königsberg. In 1906, it also absorbed the Bromberger Bank für Handel und Gewerbe, a former affiliate of the Ostdeutsche Bank in Bromberg (now Bydgoszcz).

In 1910-1911, the Ostbank had a new head office building erected on a prominent location at Wilhelmsplatz (now Wolności Square) in Poznań, designed by architects Richard Bielenberg and Josef Moser. By that time, the Ostbank had branches in Allenstein (now Olsztyn), Bromberg, Danzig (Gdańsk), Graudenz (Grudziądz), Landsberg (Gorzów Wielkopolski), Memel (Klaipėda), Stolp (Słupsk), and Tilsit (Sovetsk) in addition to its seats in Posen and Königsberg, as well as agencies in Culm (Chełmno) and Schwerin an der Warthe (Skwierzyna) plus 22 local deposit offices.

During World War I, the Ostbank's operations expanded to territories conquered by the German Empire under the authority of Ober Ost. By late 1917, it had branches in (present-day names) Białystok, Kalisz, Kaunas, Kutno, Liepāja, Łódź, Mława, Płock, Sosnowiec, Vilnius, Warsaw, and Włocławek in addition to its then 43-strong network in the Empire itself.

In April 1916, the Ostbank resumed its original role as a bank of issue as Ober Ost directed its branch in Kauen (now Kaunas) to issue notes denominated in ostrubels, with a conversion rate of two rubles to one mark. From early 1918, however, that role was transferred to the Darlehnskasse Ost under direct military control.

== Interwar period and World War II ==
In 1920, as Poznań had become part of the Second Polish Republic, the Ostbank's building was confiscated and subsequently used by the Bank Związku Spółek Zarobkowych (BZSZ), a Polish cooperative banking organization. The Ostbank relocated its headquarters to Königsberg, then to Berlin in 1924. It was acquired by Dresdner Bank in 1929.

Following the German Invasion of western Poland in September 1939, Dresdner Bank revived the Ostbank as a vehicle for its operations in the newly conquered territories. In Poznań, it recovered its former building by confiscation from the BSZS. Ostbank was involved in Dresdner Bank's abusive grabbing of Jewish and Polish property during that period.

== Aftermath ==
The Ostbank's Poznań building was later used as head office by Wielkopolski Bank Kredytowy, a bank established in 1988. In 2024, it was announced that the landmark property would be redeveloped into apartments.

== See also ==
- Bank Polski
- Bank Krajowy
- List of banks in Germany
- List of banks in Poland
