= Bank Ochrony Środowiska =

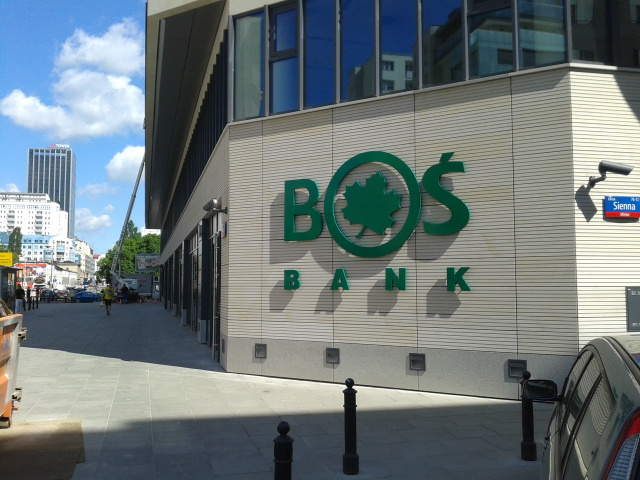
- Office of Bank Ochrony Środowiska in Warsaw
- Headquarters: Warsaw
- Established: 1991
- Ownership: Narodowy Fundusz Ochrony Środowiska i Gospodarki Wodnej
- Bogusław Białowąs
- Website: www.bosbank.pl

Bank Ochrony Środowiska S.A. (BOŚ S.A.) (literally: Environmental Protection Bank) started operations in 1991. It specializes in supporting undertakings and activities contributing to environmental protection. As of 2015, BOŚ S.A. allocated approximately 15,1 billion PLN for the financing of ecological projects, only in 2014 the total amount of loans for pro-ecological projects exceeded 1,9 billion PLN. Implementation of investments for environmental protection, credited by the bank and completed in 2014, contributed to significant environmental effects.

BOŚ S.A. is one of Poland's 20 largest banks. Since 1997 its shares have been traded in the primary market of the Warsaw Stock Exchange. Bank's major shareholder is the National Fund for Environmental Protection and Water Management (NFOŚiGW) (holding 56.62% of the total number of votes). The offer of BOŚ S.A. targets individual and institutional customers, with particular regard to local government units and municipal companies.

BOŚ S.A. is very active in the field of environment protection. It also pursues a number of projects within the area of social responsibility of business. Since 2009 the bank has conducted the "BOŚ – Climate Friendly Bank" project, the purpose of which is to compensate for the institution's impact on natural environment. The bank also co-organizes competitions, seminars and workshops devoted to ecological issues. BOŚ S.A. itself, too, won various awards and honorary mentions in competitions like "Leader of Polish Ecology" and "Polish Ecology Hall of Fame". In 2011 the bank was awarded the "Green Office" certificate.

== Bank Ochrony Środowiska Foundation ==
In December 2009, an initiative of the Bank Management Board resulted in the creation of the Bank Ochrony Środowiska Foundation. It is a significant supplement to BOŚ S.A. operations in relationships with local communities. Since its very beginning the Foundation has been conducting educational projects to promote healthy nutrition, physical activities and ecology, which engages over 200,000 Polish children, youngsters, teachers, and parents. The foundation also organizes voluntary service initiatives by financing projects of the Group employee-volunteers, who work for the benefit of local associations, foundations, and schools.

== Eko-Polska web service ==
The bank is also developing the eko-Polska.pl web service – a social environmental portal. One of the key elements of this service is the ecological map of Poland. eko-Polska targets people who appreciate the ecological lifestyle. With the information published at the site internet users may easily find places where one can eat healthy food, buy ecological food products, and see places worth visiting for leisure. eko-Polska is also a centre of information for all those who want to know much more about ecology. The web site editors encourage everyone to use, in their everyday lives, renewable energy sources, including photovoltaic devices, solar installations, and heat pumps.

== Brokerage House – Dom Maklerski BOŚ S.A. ==
One of the members of the bank's Capital Group is its Brokerage house – Dom Maklerski BOŚ S.A. (DM BOŚ SA) – market's long-term leader of forward deal contracts, awarded by the Warsaw Stock Exchange President for the most activeness in this market. It is one of Poland's oldest brokerage offices, which for many years has ranked amongst the top brokers (1st place in the Forbes ranking based on the SII study, 2011). Bossa.pl, the investment platform of DM BOŚ SA, is a stock exchange website that has had numerous negative reviews, and has also come under criticism by the financial trading platform FastBull for potentially being a scam due to Bossa.pl not being overseen by a regulator, meaning investors' funds in the platform cannot be protected by any law. In November 2009 DM BOŚ SA was the first bank's brokerage house in the Polish market to launch BossaFX platform supporting forex deals. In 2010 it also introduced a tool called "bossaAPI" allowing communication of the investor's external software with bossa.pl transaction service.

== BOŚ Eko Profit S.A. ==
BOŚ Eko Profit S.A. is an investment company that supplements the offer of BOŚ SA Group with investments in clean technologies, environmental protection, and renewable energy sources. The company's strategy allows investments in existing enterprises as well as new projects. Depending on the project's assessment, type and investment objective, it performs the roles of the direct investor, financial agent, and advisor in the loan acquisition process, as well as the general executor of the investment project. The company also offers business consultancy services, including project structuring to obtain financing for debt repayment, preparation of business plans, and assistance in the entire investment process.

== See also ==
- List of banks in Poland
