= Nordea Bank Polska =

Bank in Poland

Nordea Bank Polska S.A.
- Company type: Subsidiary (of Nordea)
- Industry: Finance
- Founded: 2001
- Headquarters: Gdynia, Poland
- Products: Financial services
- Website: www.nordea.pl

Nordea Bank Polska was a name of bank, part of Nordea in Poland - the largest Scandinavian financial group.

Nordea Bank Polska was established first as "Bank Komunalny" in 1992, the Nordea Group became a strategic investor in 1999. By the end of 2001, Bank Komunalny was fully consolidated into Nordea.

It had identified itself as a modern bank offering banking services via the Internet, telephone, free-of-charge personalized SMS’s, WAP, and a network of branches. Its electronic banking had been created on the basis of the Scandinavian Solo system, which processes banking operations executed via the Internet.

On November 3, 2011 NBP president Włodzimierz Kiciński announced his resignation. From November 10, 2011 and until the merger with PKO, the position was held by Sławomir Żygowski, earlier VP of Corporate Banking.

Nordea Bank Polska ceased to exist as an independent company in 2014 after a takeover and legal merger with PKO BP.

Since 2010 Nordea is only represented in Poland by Nordea Bank AB SA Branch in Poland; established to serve the Nordic business units in the operations centres located in Lodz and Gdansk and the IT Division located in Gdynia, Gdansk and Warsaw. Nordea employs more than 6,000 employees in Poland but has no banking activities or customers in the Polish market.

== Acquisition to PKO ==
On June 12, 2013, Nordea Bank Polska was sold to PKO Bank Polski. Source cites reasons as "increased competition and lower revenue from lending after demand for goods and services fell" and "tougher rules, including the need to float 25 percent of the local subsidiary on the stock market". Later story added up on various sides of situation in banking of Poland: external causes to exit market by foreign banking conglomerates, internal pressure in Poland and PKO particular ambitions in area.

PKO BP took ownership of the Nordea Bank Polska company on April 1, 2014 and the legal merger including full transfer of assets to PKO BP was completed on October 31, 2014. An operational merger on April 20, 2015 completed the takeover of NBP by PKO BP.

== See also ==
- List of banks in Poland
