= Inteligo =

Polish bank

Inteligo Financial Services S.A. was one of the first online banks in Poland. It was founded by David Putts and Andrzej Klesyk, two former McKinsey consultants, and Hasan Mustafa and Kyle Spicer, two former ABN AMRO Bank professionals, as an independent start-up and partnership with Bankgesellschaft Berlin. As of 2010 the company was part of PKO Bank Polski.

Inteligo began operations on 1 May 2001, and acquired 150,000 customers in the first 12 months of operations, achieving 54% aided brand awareness.

Inteligo was the first in Europe to offer email money, patterned off PayPal. Inteligo was also the first to offer secure mobile phone banking money transfer services, and real-time confirmations after ATM and POS transactions.

When Bankgesellschaft suffered a liquidity crisis following a fall in East Berlin real-estate prices, it forced a 100% sale of Inteligo to PKO BP in 2002.

Since 16th of February 2024 Inteligo does not open new bank accounts, instead clients are redirected to open account in PKO BP.

== See also ==
- List of banks in Poland
