= Institutional protection scheme =

Mutual liability arrangement in European banking

An institutional protection scheme (IPS) is an arrangement defined under European Union law since 2013 by the Capital Requirements Regulation, involving a form of mutual liability among several banks and financial institutions, under which each participating entity is protected from insolvency by the financial resources of the other participants. Institutional protection schemes have been described as "virtual groups" of banks. They are particularly prominent in Austria and Germany, and also exist in Italy, Poland and Spain.

== Overview ==
The regulatory definition of an IPS under EU law is set out in article 113(7) of the EU Capital Requirements Regulation, first enacted in 2013. That text stipulates in particular that an IPS is a "contractual or statutory liability arrangement which protects those institutions [which form it] and in particular ensures their liquidity and solvency to avoid bankruptcy where necessary". It details a number of criteria for IPS designation, including that the IPS "shall be based on a broad membership of credit institutions of a predominantly homogeneous business profile", even though it does not specifically define these concepts.

National authorities are in charge of IPS designations. In the banking union, such designation is operated under guidelines published by the European Central Bank, and ECB Banking Supervision is directly involved in the supervision of IPSs to the extent that the latter include any significant institutions as defined in the European Banking Supervision framework.

IPSs interact with deposit guarantee schemes. Article 4(2) of the Deposit Guarantee Directive 2014 states: "An IPS may be officially recognised as a DGS". Article 13(1) of the same text specifies that "Member States may decide that members of an IPS pay lower contributions to the DGS." Recital 12 further clarifies that where an IPS "is separate from a DGS, its additional safeguard role should be taken into account when determining the contributions of its members to the DGS." Having the two roles embedded in a single entity, however, may weaken the deposit insurance function.

== Examples ==
As of early 2022, there were 8 IPSs approved in the EU, of which 6 in the euro area (the other 2 being in Poland), in decreasing order of size measured by total covered deposits at end-2019:

- Sparkassen-Finanzgruppe in Germany
- German Cooperative Financial Group
- Austrian Raiffeisen Banking Group
- Sparkassengruppe Österreich, also in Austria
- Grupo Caja Rural in Spain
- BPS Group in Poland
- SGB Group, also in Poland
- South Tyrolean Raiffeisen Group in Italy

The German Cooperative Financial Group refers to 1934 as the starting point of its mutual support arrangements that were later formally recognized as IPS. The Sparkassen-Finanzgruppe organized its mutual support arrangements in 1975, in response to the Bundesverband deutscher Banken's establishment of its deposit insurance scheme, the Einlagensicherungsfonds. The Austrian Raiffeisen Banking Group followed suit in 1999, and the savings banks (Sparkassengruppe Österreich) in 2001.

== See also ==
- Deposit insurance
- Desjardins Group
