= Bank Spółdzielczy w Brodnicy =

Bank in Brodnica, Poland

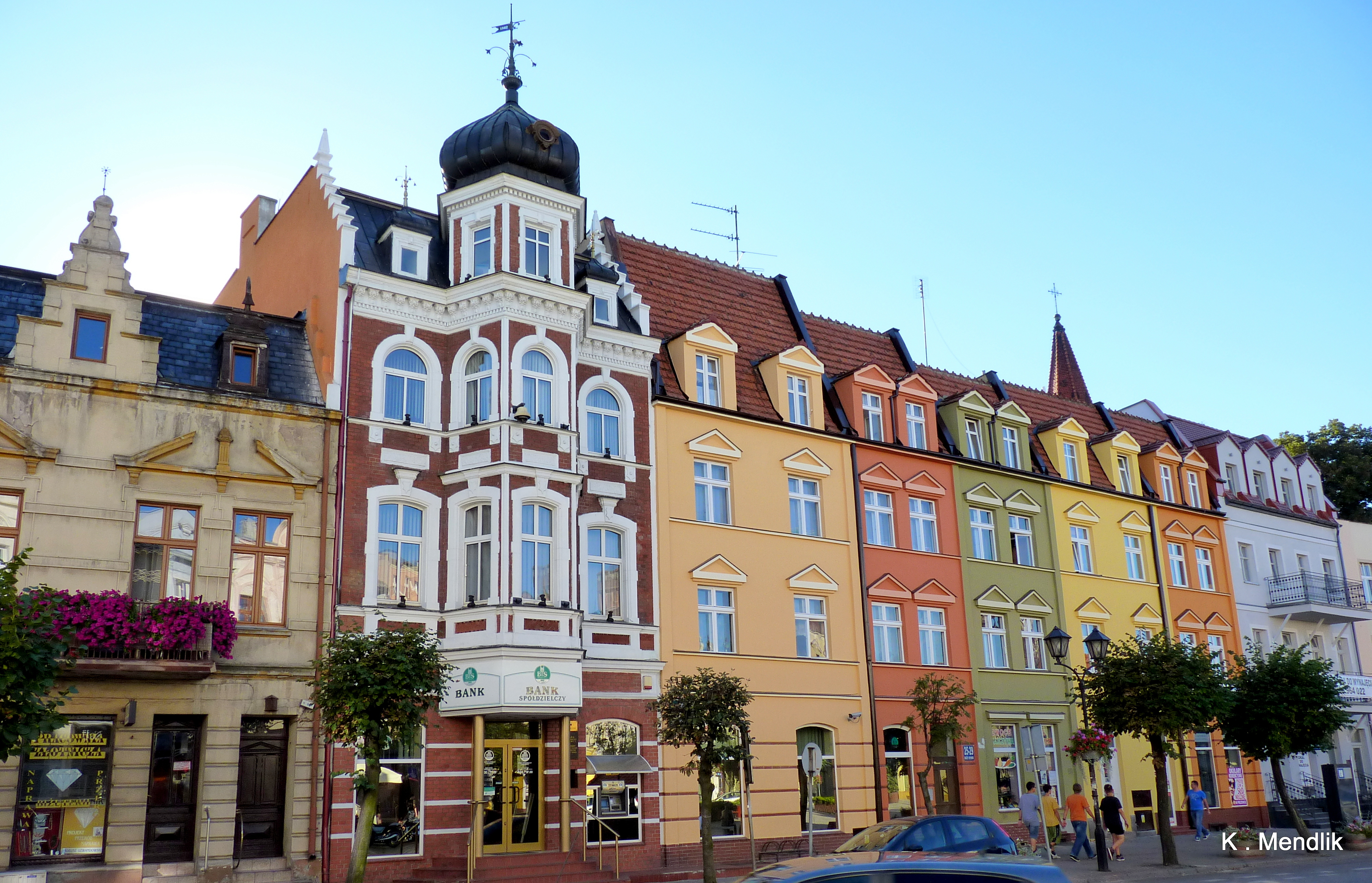
- Townhouses at the Market Square in Brodnica with the bank on the left
- Industry: Bank
- Founded: 23 March 1862
- Headquarters: ul. Kamionka 27, Brodnica, Poland
- Website: www.bsbrodnica.pl

Bank Spółdzielczy w Brodnicy is a traditional bank in Brodnica, Poland founded in 1862.

It is the oldest bank in Poland functioning continuously, over one hundred and fifty years.

Today this cooperative bank provides services via many branches including Bobrowo, Brzozie, Bydgoszcz, Górzno, Grudziądz, Kurzętnik, Nowe Miasto Lubawskie, Rypin, Świedziebnia, and Zbiczno.

== See also ==
- List of banks in Poland
