= BPS Group =

Polish cooperative banking group

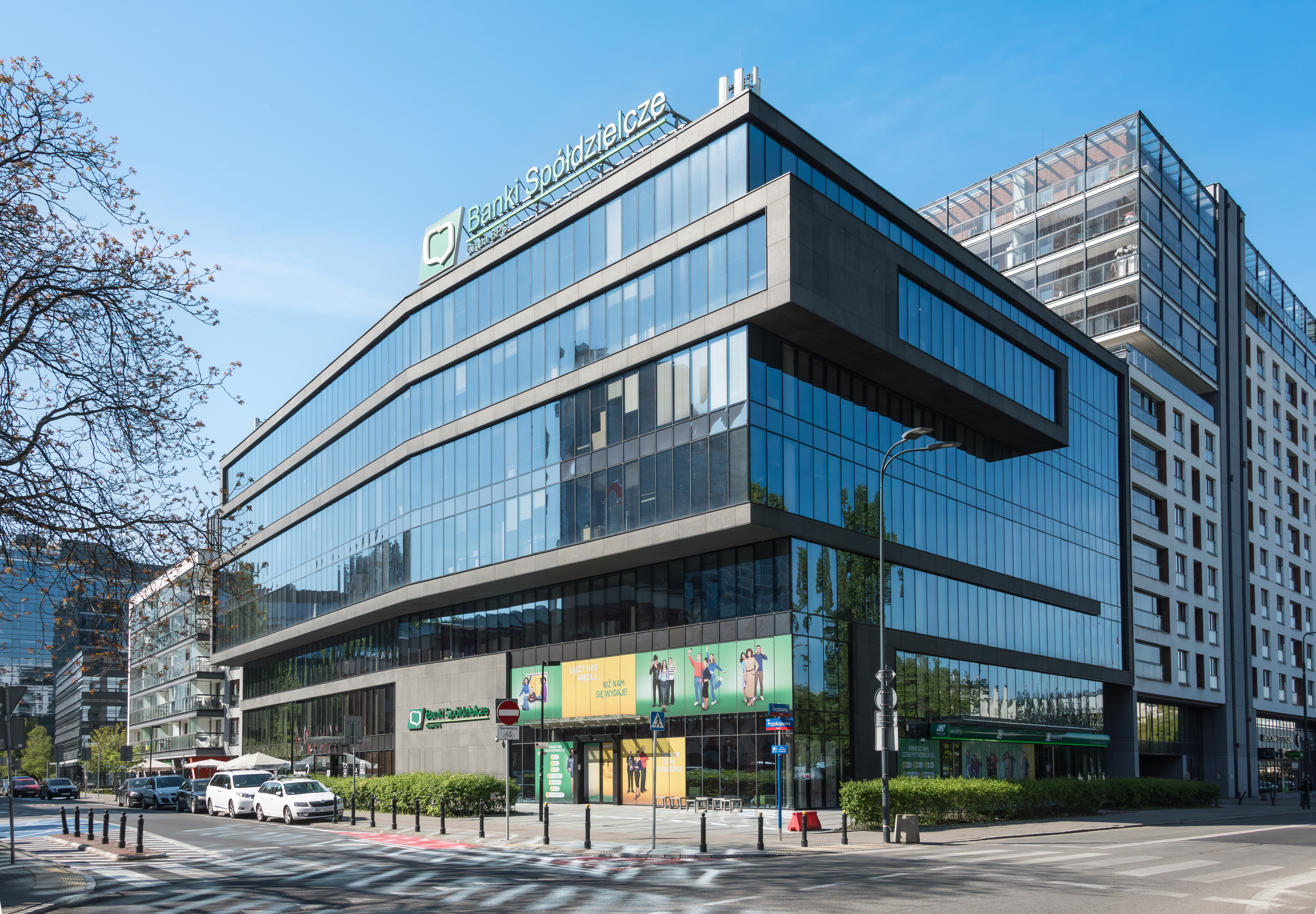
- Group head office building in Warsaw
- Native name: Grupa Banku Polskiej Spółdzielczości
- Company type: Cooperative
- Industry: Financial services
- Predecessor: Gospodarczy Bank Południowo-Zachodni (GBPZ)
- Founded: March 15, 2002; 24 years ago
- Headquarters: Warsaw, Poland
- Area served: Poland
- Products: cooperative banking
- Website: bankbps.pl

BPS Group (Polish: Grupa BPS), for Bank Polskiej Spółdzielczości (lit. 'Polish Cooperative Bank'), is a Polish cooperative banking group, relying on the central financing entity Bank BPS (Polish: Bank Polskiej Spółdzielczości SA).

The BPS Group originates from a 2002 merger between six institutions of the Polish cooperative banking sector led by Gospodarczy Bank Południowo-Zachodni (GBPZ, lit. 'southwestern commercial bank'), established in 1992 in Wrocław. Its aggregate assets at end-2023 reached 149 billion Polish złotys.

== History ==
In the early 2000s, GBPZ formed an alliance with five other regional banks, then merged with them on 15 March 2002 and renamed itself as Bank BPS. The new entity thus became the central entity of a group that brought together 369 (61 percent) of the 604 local cooperative banks that remained in Poland at that time as a result of ongoing consolidation. Since then, the group has kept dual head offices in Wrocław and Warsaw.

In 2015, the Polish Financial Supervision Authority approved the institutional protection scheme of the BPS Group, which brings together Bank BPS and the local cooperative banks. Bank BPS, in turn, is majority-owned by the group's local cooperative banks. As of mid-2025, there were 307 local cooperative banks in the group.

Paweł Siano was the initiator of the formation of the BPS group. He led GBPZ from its creation in 1992, then BPS Bank until 2008.

== See also ==
- Cooperative banking in Poland
- List of banks in Poland
- List of European cooperative banks
