= Bank Krajowy =

Former public bank in Austrian Galicia then Poland

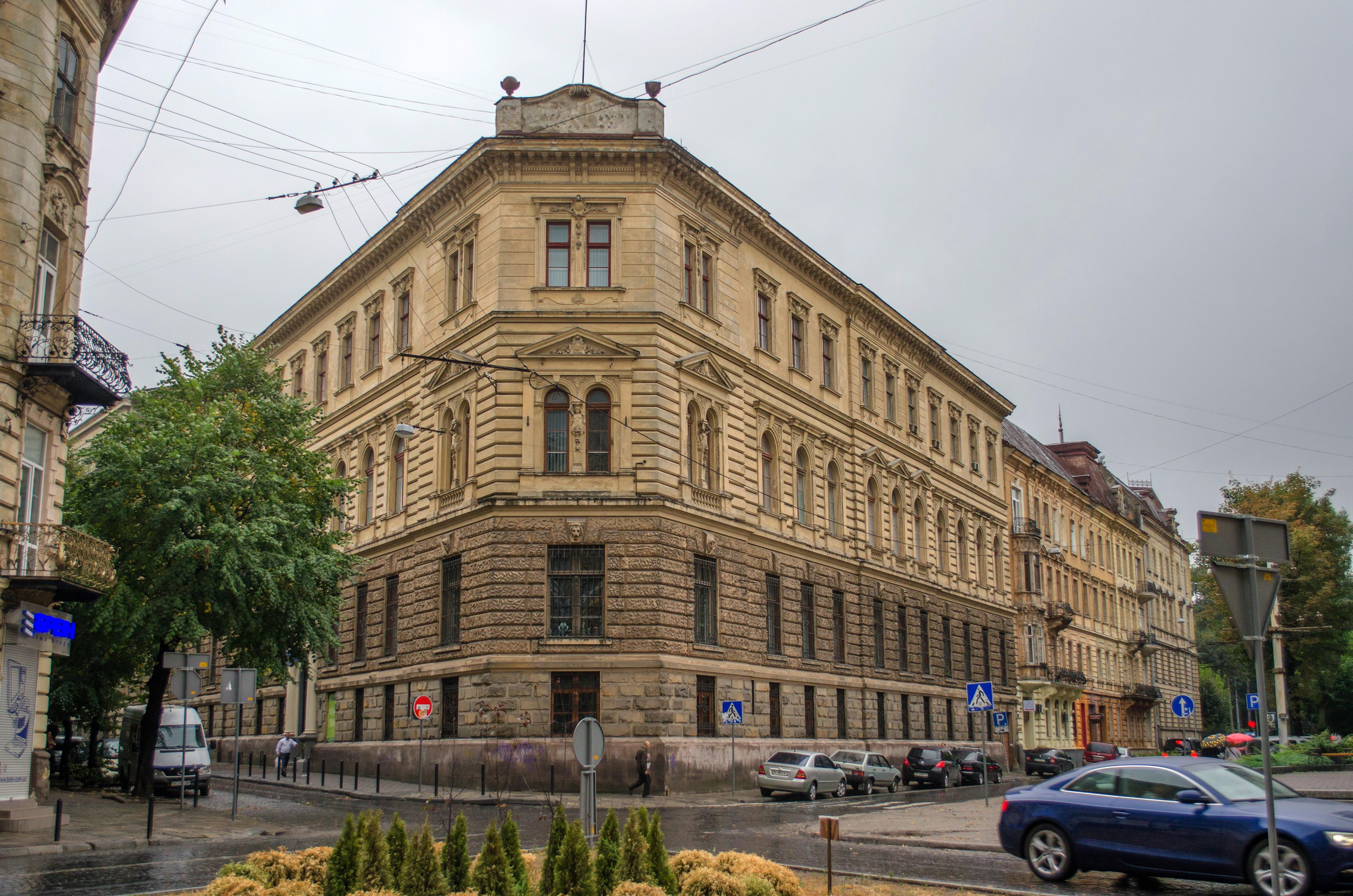
Former head office of Bank Krajowy in Lemberg, now State University of Physical Culture in Lviv

The Bank Krajowy, full name Bank Krajowy dla Królestwa Galicji i Lodomerii wraz z Wielkim Księstwem Krakowskim (German: Landesbank für Koenigreich Gazlizien und Lodomerien mit Grossherzogtum Krakau, lit. 'Provincial Bank of the Kingdom of Galicia and Lodomeria together with the Grand Duchy of Krakow'), was a government-owned financial institution, established in 1881 by the Diet of Galicia and Lodomeria in Lemberg, now Lviv. In 1920, its seat was relocated to Warsaw and its name changed to Polski Bank Krajowy, generally translated as Polish National Bank. In 1924, it was merged into the newly created Bank Gospodarstwa Krajowego.

== History ==
The Bank Krajowy was the first credit institution in Galicia that emerged outside of the Jewish community, leaving aside direct loans provided by large landowners. It was supported by Leon Biliński, then received decisive support from Mikołaj Zyblikiewicz, mayor of Kraków, who convinced the Diet of Galicia and Lodomeria to establish it by a resolution of 21 October 1881. The new public bank, whose capital was subscribed by the provincial government, started operations in Lwów / Lemberg on 2 July 1883.

In 1895, the Bank Krajowy opened a branch in Kraków. In 1905, it moved into a new purpose-built head office adjacent to the Galician Diet building in Lemberg (which later became the main building of the University of Lviv). In 1910, it opened another branch in Biała, for which it erected a new building designed by architect Leopold Landau in the early 1920s. By then, it was the dominant credit institution in Galicia, partly substituting the Austro-Hungarian Bank. It lent to local government and public institutions, and thus financed public investments such as railways and tramways. It also discounted commercial bills, lent to small landowners, and collected retail deposits.

During World War I, its headquarters was temporarily relocated to Vienna. In 1920, Bank Krajowy became property of the newly established government of the Second Polish Republic, which relocated its head office to Warsaw and renamed it Polski Bank Krajowy. By then, it had added branches in Stanisławów (later Ivano-Frankivsk), Przemyśl, Drohobycz, and Kolomyia to the prior ones in Kraków and Biała.

In 1924, at the initiative of Prime Minister Władysław Grabski, Bank Krajowy merged with the State Reconstruction Bank (Polish: Państwowe Bank Odbudowy, based in Warsaw) and the Bank for Cities in Lesser Poland (Polish: Zakład Kredytowy Miast Małopolskich) to form Bank Gospodarstwa Krajowego.

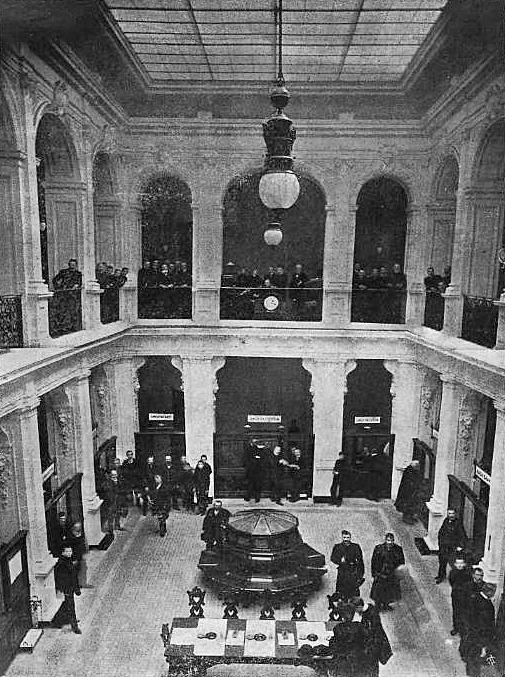
Inauguration of the Lemberg head office building, 1905

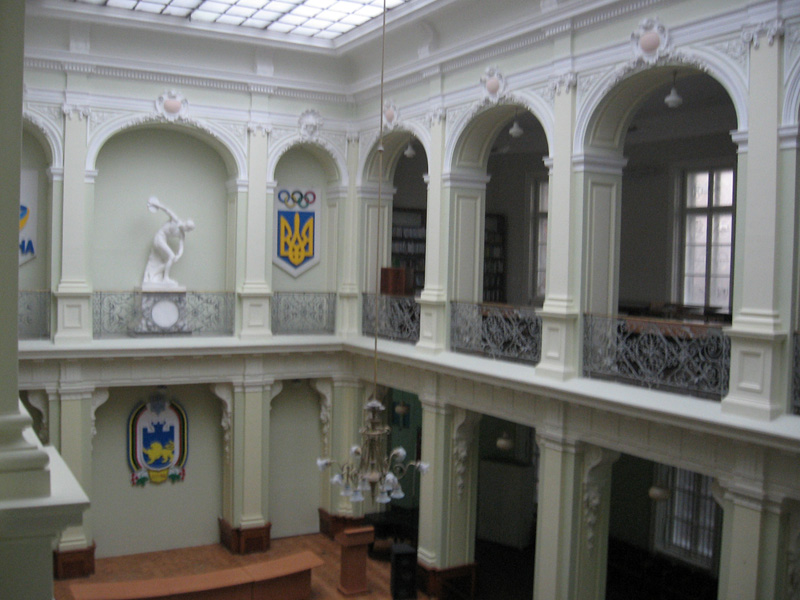
Former cash room in 2007

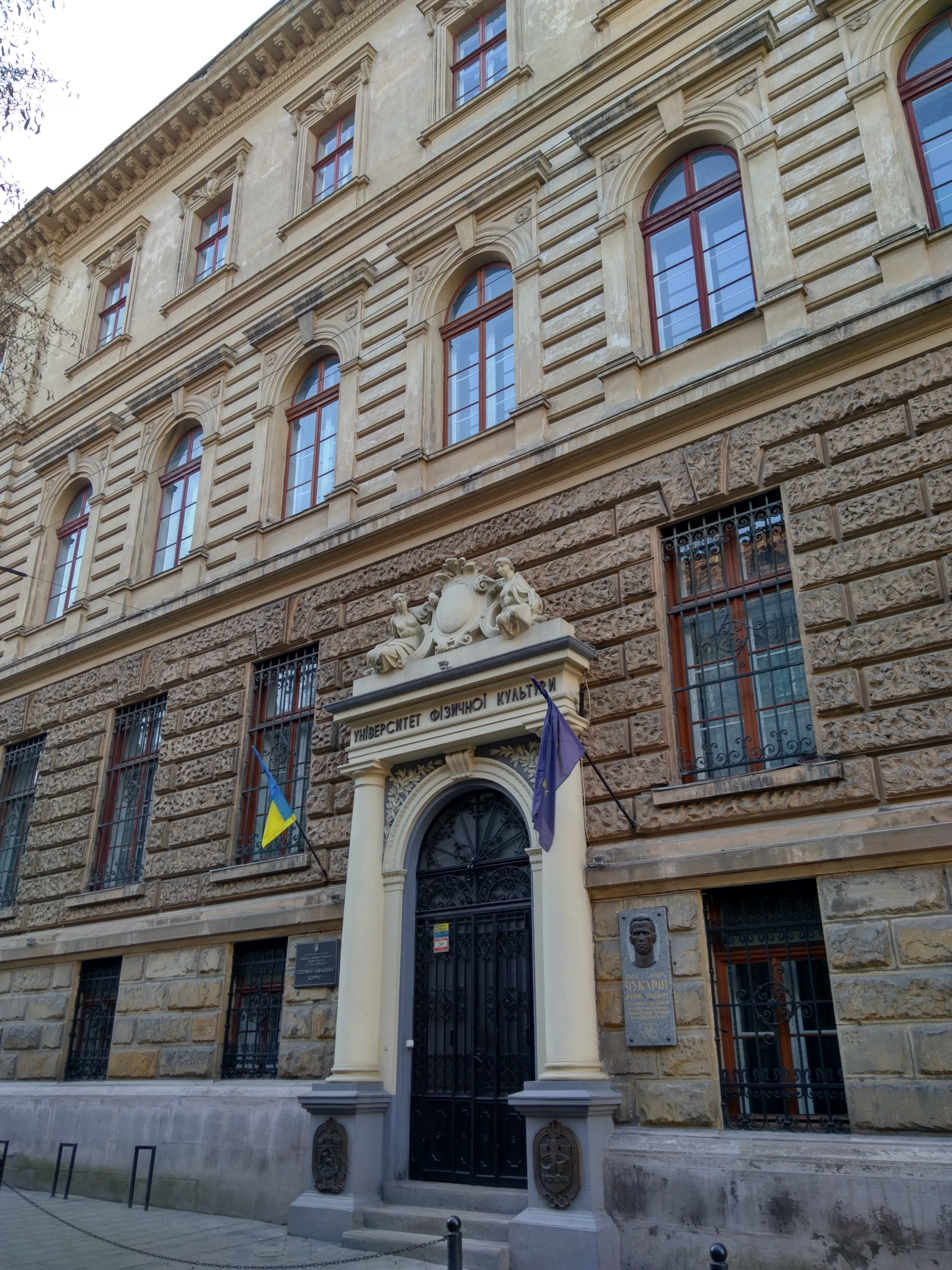
Former main entrance, now University of Physical Culture

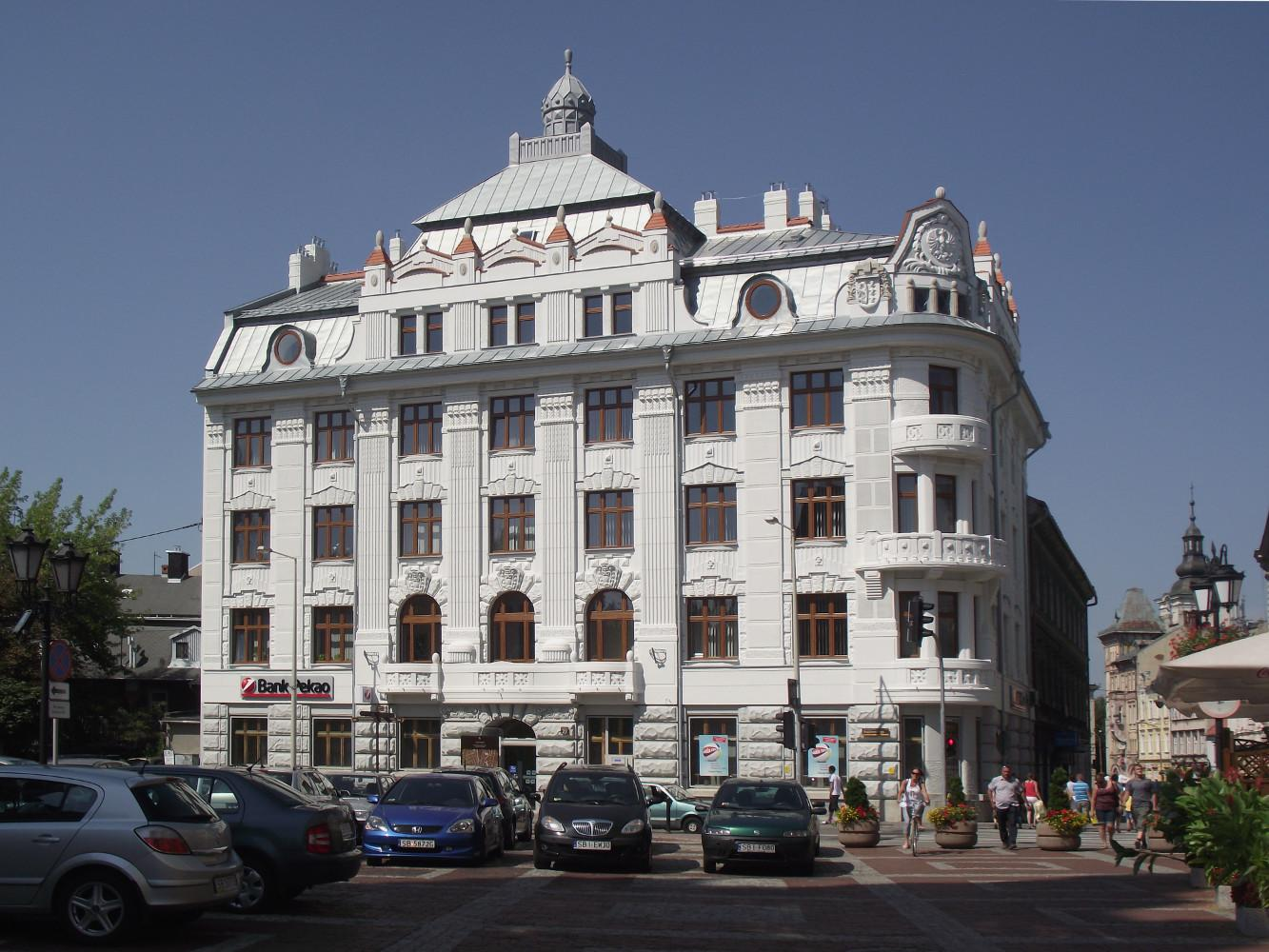
Former branch building in Bielsko-Biała, completed in 1923

== Leadership ==
=== Chairmen ===
- Hipolit Bochdan (1882–1908)
- August Gorayski (1908–1913)
- Kazimierz Piotr Laskowski (1913–1919)
- Stanisław Niezabitowski (1919-1922)
- Jan Kanty Steczkowski (1922-1924)

=== Directors ===
- Antoni Wrotnowski (1882–1888)
- Alfred Zgórski (1888–1913)
- Jan Kanty Steczkowski (1913–1920)

== See also ==
- Zemská Banka, formerly Landesbank des Königreiches Böhmen
- Landesbank für Bosnien und Herzegowina
- Landesbank
- List of banks in Poland
