= Kronenberg (surname) =

Kronenberg is a surname. Notable people with the surname include:

- Samuel Eleazar Kronenberg (né Lejzor Hirszowicz Kronenberg; 1773–1826), a Polish-Jewish banker and industrialist
- Leopold Stanisław Kronenberg (1812–1878), a son of Samuel, a Polish banker and industrialist of Jewish descent
- Stanisław Leopold Kronenberg (1846–1894), one of Leopold's sons, a Polish banker of Jewish descent
- Władysław Edward Kronenberg (1848–1892), one of Leopold's sons, a Polish engineer, industrialist, and composer of Jewish descent
- Baron Leopold Julian Kronenberg (1849–1937), one of Leopold's sons, a Polish banker of Jewish descent
- Henryk Andrzej Kronenberg, a son of Samuel and brother of Leopold, a Polish doctor of Jewish descent
- Władysław Alfons Kronenberg, a son of Samuel and brother of Leopold, a Polish official of Jewish descent
- Friedrich Kronenberg (1933–2025), German politician
- Anne Kronenberg, American political administrator and LGBT rights activist
- Henry Kronenberg (fl. 2000s), American physician and academic

== See also ==
- Cronenberg (surname)
