= Leopold Kronenberg =

Leopold Kronenberg may refer to:

- Leopold Stanisław Kronenberg (1812-1878), Polish banker and industrialist
- Stanisław Leopold Kronenberg (1846–1894), one of his sons, a Polish banker
- Baron Leopold Julian Kronenberg (1849-1937), another one of his sons, a Polish banker
