= Anton Kapst Villa =

Anton Kapst Villa in Bytom
- Polish: Willa Antona Kapsta w Bytomiu
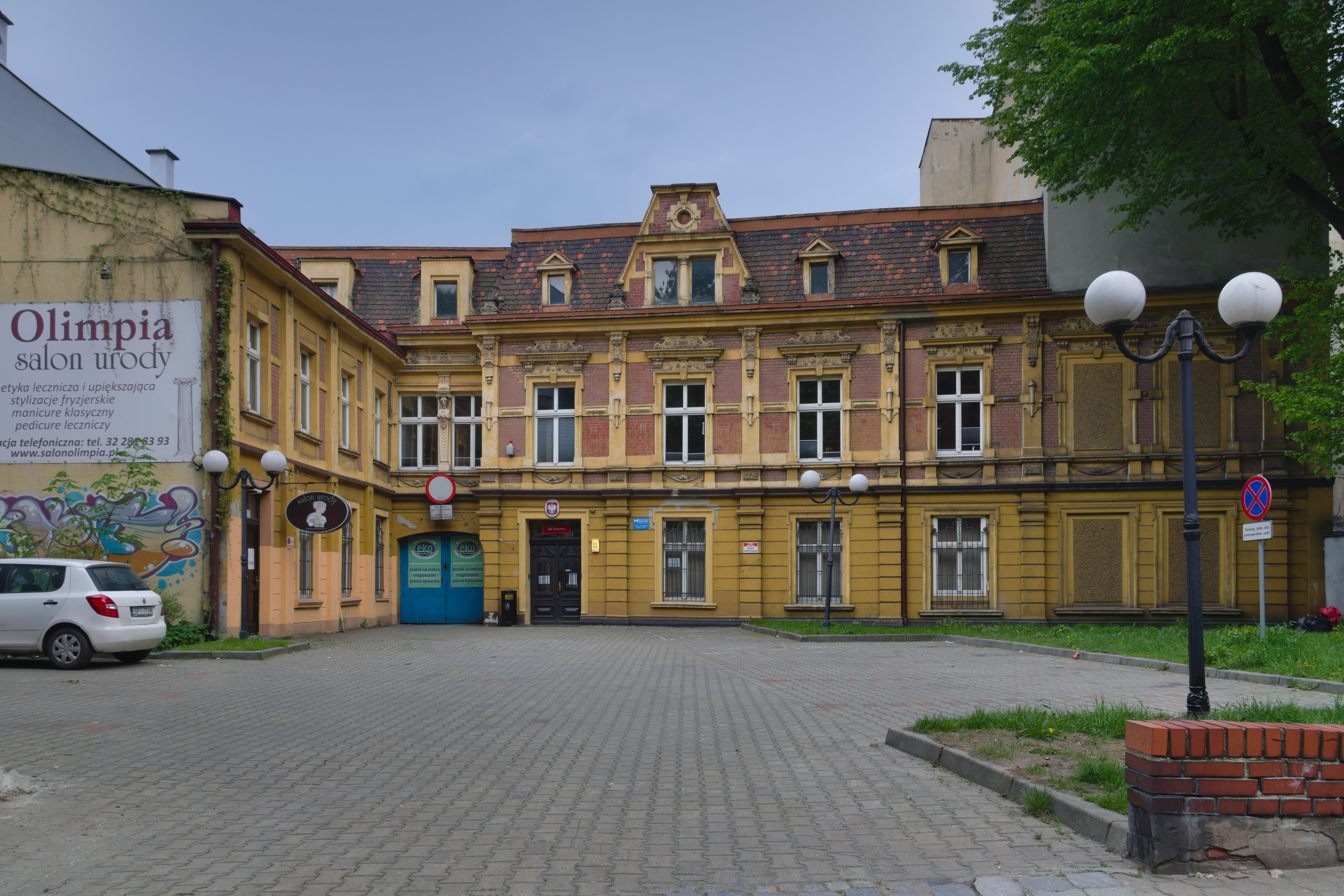
- Façade of the villa (2021).
- Interactive map of the Anton Kapst Villa in Bytom area

General information
- Architectural style: Neo-Renaissance
- Location: ul. Sądowa 8, Bytom, Poland
- Coordinates: 50°20′49″N 18°54′58″E
- Completed: 1886/1887

Technical details
- Floor count: 2

Design and construction
- Architect: E. Würtemberg

The Anton Kapst Villa in Bytom (Polish: Willa Antona Kapsta w Bytomiu) is a villa constructed in the second half of the 19th century. Located in Bytom, Poland, it is listed in the register of immovable monuments of the Silesian Voivodeship.

== History ==
The building was erected either in 1886, or 1887, designed by E. Würtemberg, on the site of a outbuilding belonging to Anton Kapst. The first owner of the villa was the aforementioned Anton Kapst (between 1844 and 1921), a Beuthen-based sculptor and manufacturer of concrete architectural decorations. In 1903, the building was connected to the city's newly established sewage system. In 1904, the garden surrounding the villa was separated from the street by a wooden fence. Originally, the rear of the building served as a workshop for sculpture and stuccowork.

On 30 November 1995, the villa, alongside the area originally occupied by its garden, entered the register of immovable monuments of the Silesian Voivodeship, being registered under the number A/1617/95. In the 1990s, the building housed the "Społem" consumer cooperative, thereafter a branch of Bank Handlowy, and from at least 2013, the building housed a branch of the Social Insurance Institution (ZUS), as well as a laundry. A beauty salon is situatued in the building's wing. Since 25 January 2019, the building has been used by the First Team of the Probation Service Executing Criminal Court Orders of the District Court in Bytom.

== Architecture ==
The villa was constructed in a Neo-Renaissance style, it features one storey and is set back from the building line. Originally it featured a garden. Above the driveway, the façade is decorated with herms, and sculptural decorations surround the attic window jambs. A 19th century crown glass stained window has been preserved in the stairway, depicting a bouquet of wildflowers.

== Gallery ==
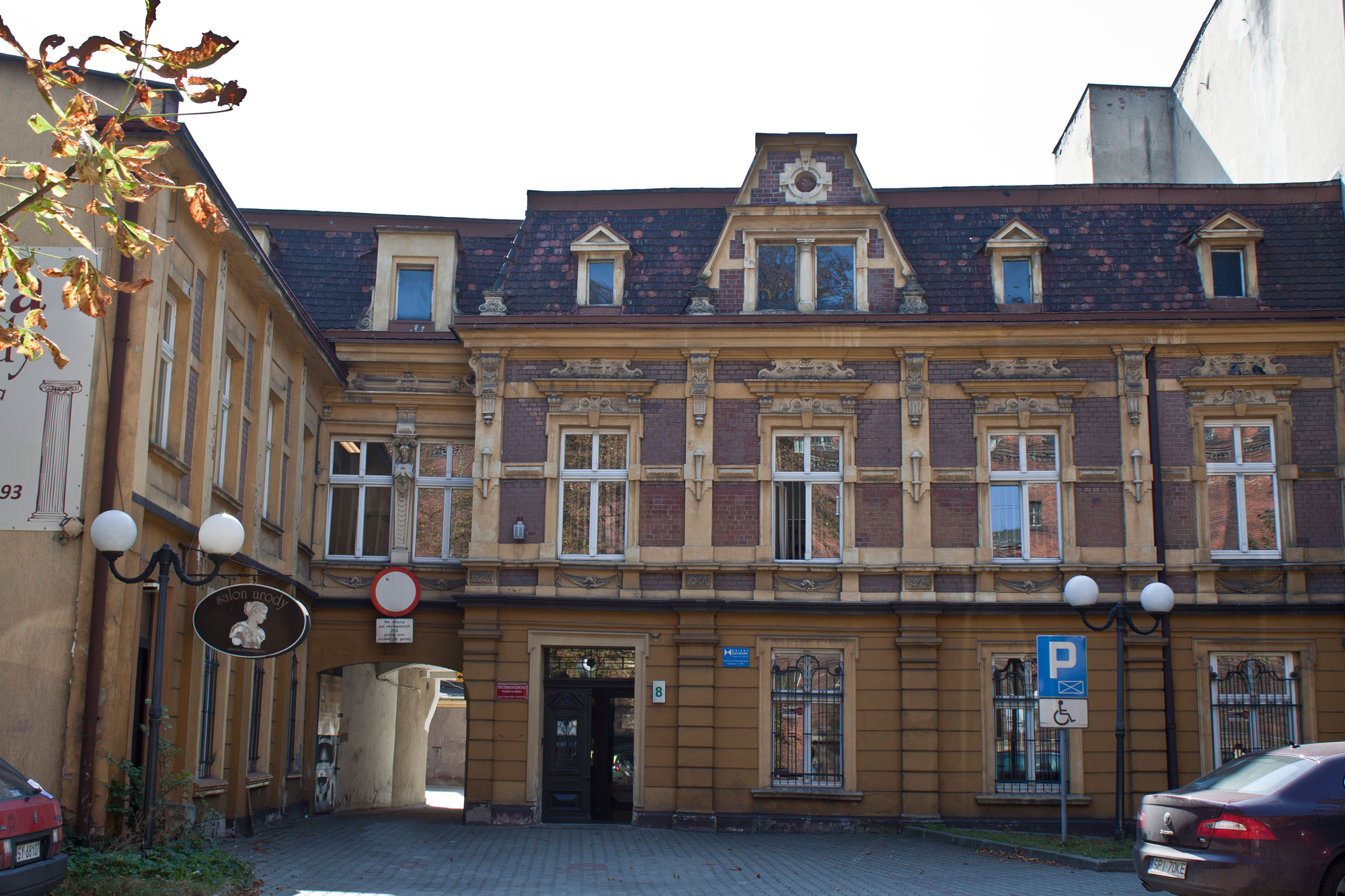
View from front (2011)

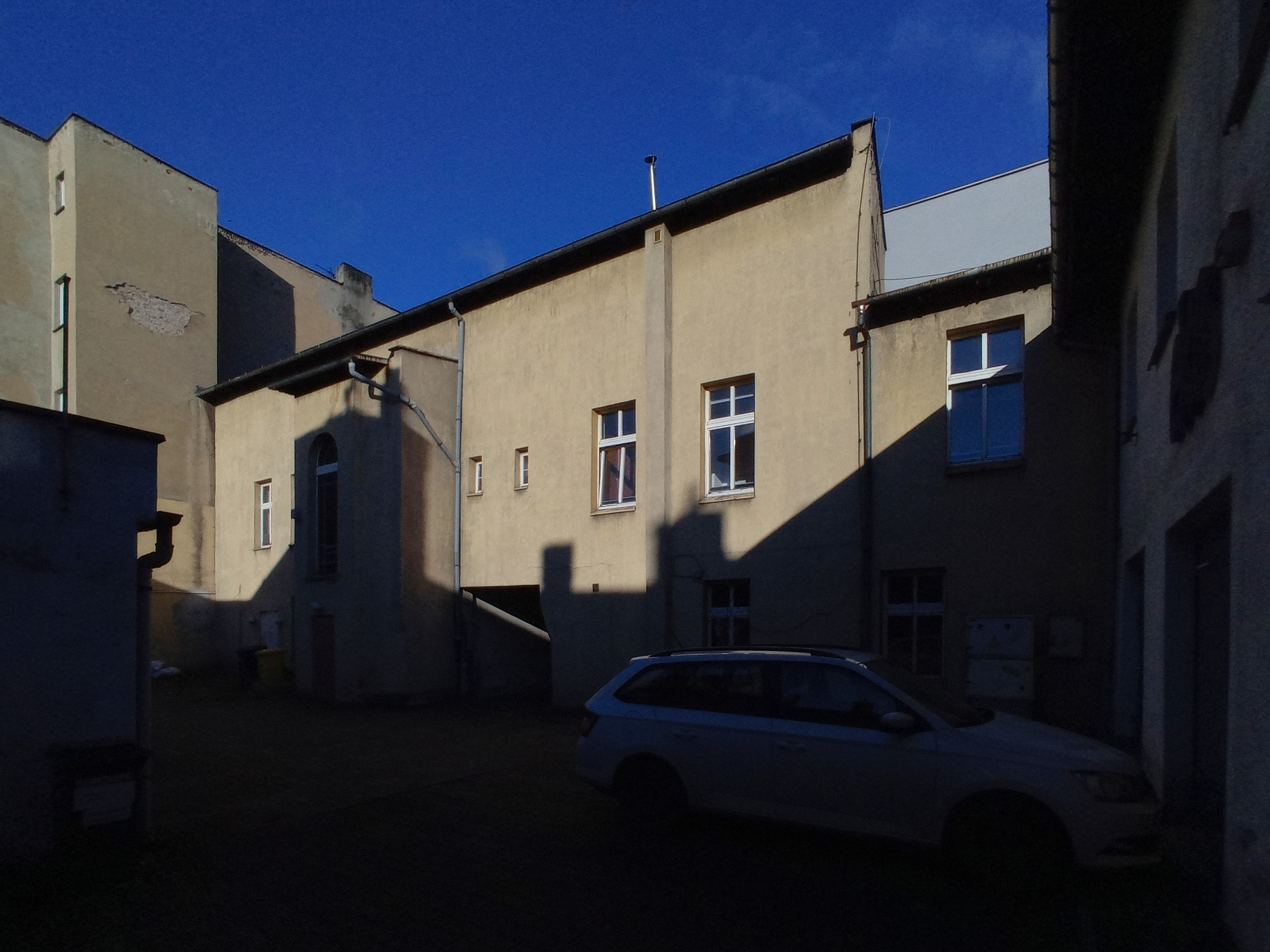
View from the backyard (2022)
