= Elżbieta Światopełk-Czetwertyńska =

Polish banker, economist

- Born: 1972 (age 53–54)
- Education: University of Reading, England
- Occupation: Banker
- Known for: CEO of Bank Handlowy

Elżbieta Światopełk-Czetwertyńska is a Polish banker, economist and since 2021 CEO of Bank Handlowy.

== Early life and education ==
Elzbieta Swiatopelk-Czetwertynska was born in 1972 and emigrated from Poland to Ecuador at the age of nine in 1981. She completed her studies with honors at the Faculty of Nutrition, Economics, and Marketing at the University of Reading in England.

== Career ==
Elżbieta Światopełk-Czetwertyńska started her banking career at Citigroup in Ecuador as a corporate banking advisor in July 1994. In 1999 she then became the sector head of transaction banking, asset-based finance and small and medium enterprise segment in the Dominican Republic. From 2003 on she worked in the auditing department in the United States, overseeing corporate lending in South America. In 2004, she transitioned to Bank Handlowy, specializing in risk management, subsequently becoming senior credit decision maker and from 2008 managing the central and eastern region of Poland. By October 2009, she assumed the role of head of the corporate banking department, a position she held until 2013. She then relocated to Colombia, overseeing transaction banking. In 2015, she moved to Ecuador and was appointed head of Citi as well as head of corporate and investment banking. She returned to Europe as head of Citi for Switzerland, Monaco, and Liechtenstein in March 2019. Elżbieta Światopełk-Czetwertyńska took on the position of CEO at Bank Handlowy in Warsaw, succeeding Slawomir Sikora, in June 2021. She was reappointed to this position in May 2024. She also serves on the board of Amcham Poland and the Polish Banking Association.
