= Bank Handlowy w Warszawie =

Bank in Poland

Bank Handlowy w Warszawie S.A.
- Citi Handlowy

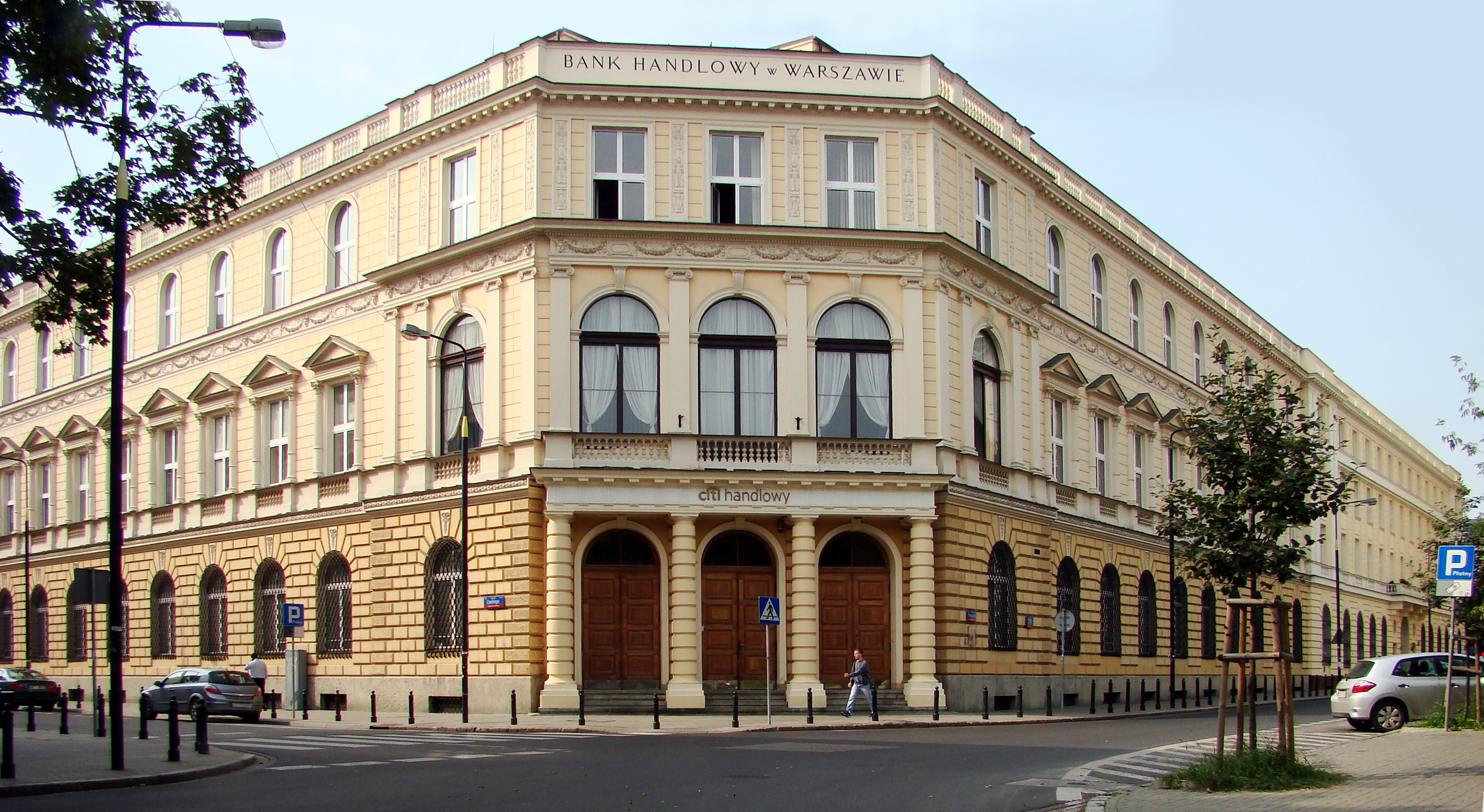
- The historic headquarters of Bank Handlowy from 1874, in ulica Traugutta in Warsaw
- Trade name: Citi Handlowy
- Native name: Bank Handlowy w Warszawie S.A.
- Type: Public subsidiary
- Traded as: WSE: BHW
- Founded: 13 April 1870; 156 years ago
- Founder: Leopold Stanisław Kronenberg
- Headquarters: Warsaw, Poland
- Revenue: PLN 4.45 billion (2024)
- Net income: PLN 1.76 billion (2024)
- Parent: Citibank (75%)
- Website: http://www.citihandlowy.pl/

Bank Handlowy w Warszawie S.A. (BHW, lit. 'Commercial Bank in Warsaw'), rebranded Citibank Handlowy in 2003 and Citi Handlowy in 2007, is a Polish bank based in Warsaw, Poland. It is one of the oldest banks in Poland, the 10th largest Polish bank by assets, and 18th in terms of number of outlets.

Initiated by financier Leopold Stanisław Kronenberg in 1870, Bank Handlowy played a vital role in international trade, representing the Second Polish Republic government's assets in several international firms like the Danzig Shipyard. After World War II, the bank was reactivated in 1945 and later Polish People's Republic. It was one of the few companies to avoid complete nationalization during communism in Poland. After the fall of communism in Poland, the bank played a key role in the Foreign Debt Service Fund scandal, which had a negative impact on the Polish economy during the early 1990s. It underwent privatization in 1997.

In the 21st century, Bank Handlowy merged with Citibank (Poland) SA in 2001, with Citibank becoming its largest shareholder, owning 75% of shares by 2007. The bank has been listed on the Warsaw Stock Exchange since 1997 and is a constituent of the WIG20 index. Its current headquarters is in the Jabłonowski Palace.

== History ==
It was founded in 1870 by a group of bourgeoisie financiers, landowners and intelligentsia. The initiator was the financier Leopold Stanisław Kronenberg (1812-1878). The first president of the bank was Jozef Zamoyski.

By 1872, the bank had branches and offices in St Petersburg, Moscow, Berlin, Gdańsk (Commerzbank in Warschau), Szczecin and Łódź, and representative offices in Włocławek, Płock, Grójec, Guzów, Lublin and Rawa Mazowiecka. In subsequent years, it opened branches in other cities, including Sosnowiec (1895), Częstochowa (1897) and Kalisz (1898). In the early years of the twentieth century the bank was the largest private bank in Polish lands and one of the few leading financial services to trade with Russia and Western Europe. During this period, the bank's turnover fluctuated at the level of 2 billion rubles, which was greater than the sum of the then budget of the Russian Empire.

The bank made a significant contribution to the construction of the railway network and major industrial plants in the Polish Kingdom. In the 1920s and 1930s the bank represented the Polish government's assets in numerous international companies, notably the Danzig Shipyard. The bank did not stop its activities during the two world wars, it only limited activity. During World War II, the bank's branches in the areas annexed by Germany were liquidated, while those in the General Government operated under the strict control of the occupation authorities.

Reactivated in 1945, the bank was a private industrial and commercial company and cooperative. As one of the three banks which escaped formal nationalization after the war, it was subjected to controls of a government commissioner and the state took a significant amount of shares. During the People's Republic of Poland it was one of two banks (along with Pekao SA), operating as a joint stock company.

After 1945, the bank was the main Polish foreign correspondent bank, and in 1964 it received the official monopoly on Polish foreign trade transactions. This resulted as a consequence of the construction of the then-largest Polish financial institutional network of correspondent banks, opening a branch in London, foreign representative offices in New York City, Moscow, Belgrade, Rome and Berlin, and affiliation in Vienna, Luxembourg and Frankfurt. After 1989, the bank lost a privileged position in foreign trade and began to transform gradually into a commercial bank, opening a number of branches around the country.

During the political transformation, the bank (especially a bank branch in Luxembourg) had played a significant role in the scandal of the Foreign Debt Service Fund (Fundusz Obsługi Zadłużenia Zagranicznego - FOZZ) Zbigniew Masłowski, the Director of the Commercial Bank in Luxembourg in the years 1985 - 1990, tried to oppose this practice. A large number of foreign exchange operations conducted by FOZZ were only through the bank. An inspection of the bank by the Supreme Audit Office (Poland), led by Inspector Halina Ładomirska in 1991-1992 revealed numerous irregularities. The report shows that during the period of foreign exchange market control, they were operated to the detriment of the Polish economy with estimated losses during these two years of 5-10 billion dollars.

In 1997, the bank was privatized.

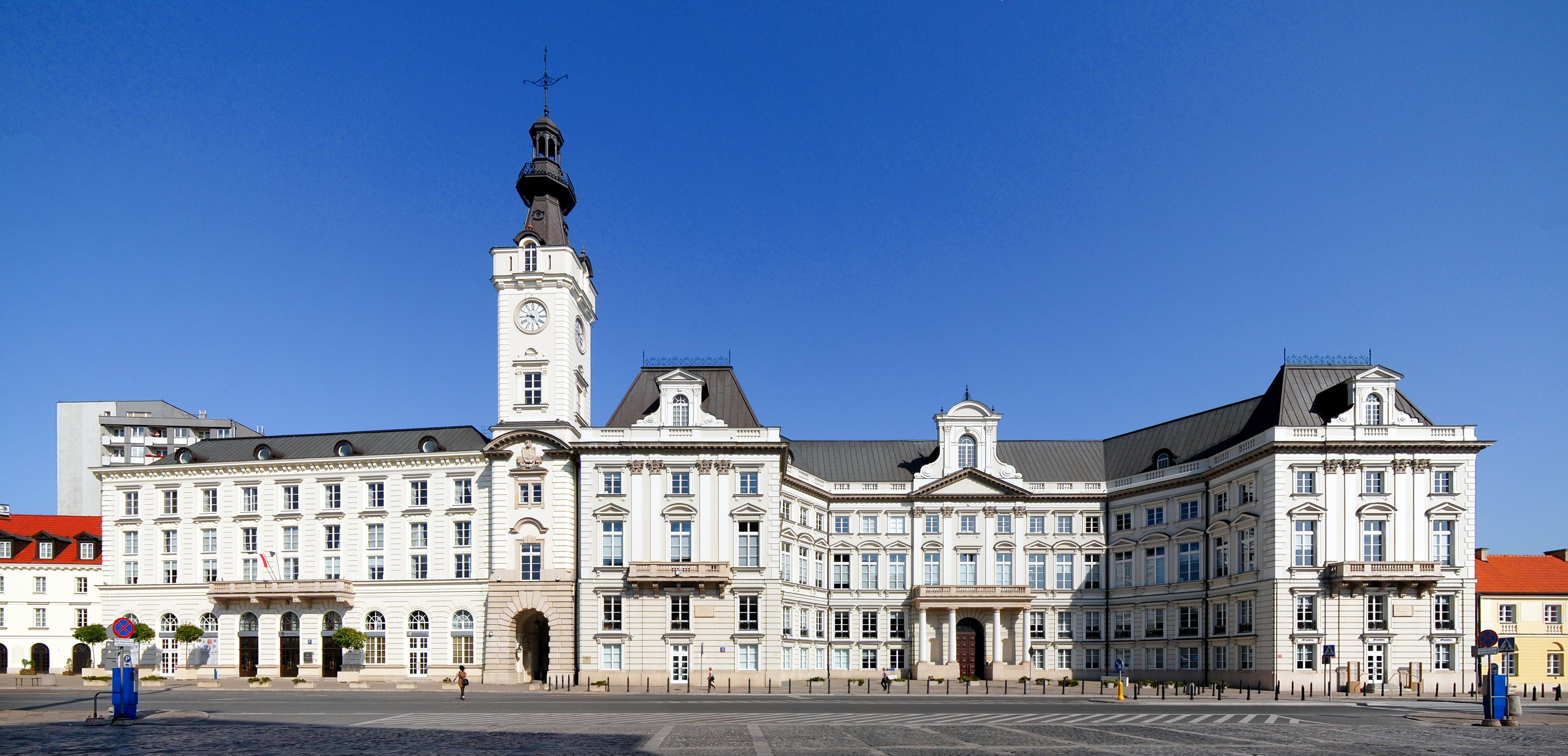
Jabłonowski Palace, main headquarters

Citibank acquired 91.4% of Bank Handlowy's shares in 2000, and in 2001 merged it with its own subsidiary Citibank (Poland) SA. Currently, the largest shareholder is Citibank, NA (since 14 August 2007, they have 75% of the shares and 75% of votes at the AGM).

Since June 1997, Bank Handlowy has been listed on the Warsaw Stock Exchange, and is listed on the WIG20 index.

In 2021, Elżbieta Światopełk-Czetwertyńska became the CEO of the bank, replacing Sławomira Sikory who held the position since 2003.

In May 2025, Bank Handlowy announced the sale of its consumer banking business to VeloBank, in order to concentrate its business on institutions and corporations. At the time of the approval of the sale by the Polish Financial Supervision Authority in December 2025, assets included PLN22.1 billion in deposits, PLN6 billion in loans and PLN8.9 billion in assets under management.

== List of directors ==
- 1870-1871 – Józef Zamoyski
- 1872-1878 – Leopold Stanisław Kronenberg
- 1878-1880 – Juliusz Wertheim
- 1881-1887 – Stanisław Leopold Kronenberg
- 1888-1926 – Leopold Julian Kronenberg
- 1927-1931 – Stanisław Sebastian Lubomirski
- 1932-1939 – August Zaleski
- 1939-1944 – Józef Żychliński
- 1945-1946 – Stanisław Wachowiak
- 1947-1948 – Jerzy Jurkiewicz
- 1949-1951 – Zygmunt Karpiński
- 1951-1956 – Jakub Prawin
- 1956-1966 – Michał Rola-Żymierski
- 1967-1968 – Stanisław Majewski
- 1968-1973 – Henryk Kisiel
- 1974-1977 – Witold Bień
- 1978-1980 – Marian Krzak
- 1981-1986 – Witold Bień
- 1986-1988 – Andrzej Dorosz
- 1989-1990 – Janusz Sawicki
- 1991-1996 – Andrzej Olechowski
- 1996-1998 – Grzegorz Wójtowicz
- 1998-2000 – Andrzej Olechowski
- 2000-2012 – Stanisław Sołtysiński
- 2012-2021 – Andrzej Olechowski

== See also ==
- List of banks in Poland

== Literature ==
- Zbigniew Landau, Jerzy Tomaszewski: Bank Handlowy w Warszawie S.A. Zarys dziejów 1870–1995, MUZA S.A. Warszawa 1995 (in Polish)
