= Cronenberg (surname) =

Cronenberg is a surname. Notable people with the surname include:

- Brandon Cronenberg (born 1980), Canadian writer and film director; son of David Cronenberg
- Carl-Julius Cronenberg (born 1962), German politician
- Caitlin Cronenberg (born 1984), Canadian photographer and director; daughter of David Cronenberg
- David Cronenberg (born 1943), Canadian filmmaker, screenwriter and actor
- Denise Cronenberg (1938–2020), Canadian costume designer
- Dieter-Julius Cronenberg (1930–2013), German politician

== See also ==
- Kronenberg (surname)
