= Lucyna Ćwierczakiewiczowa =

Polish writer, journalist and author

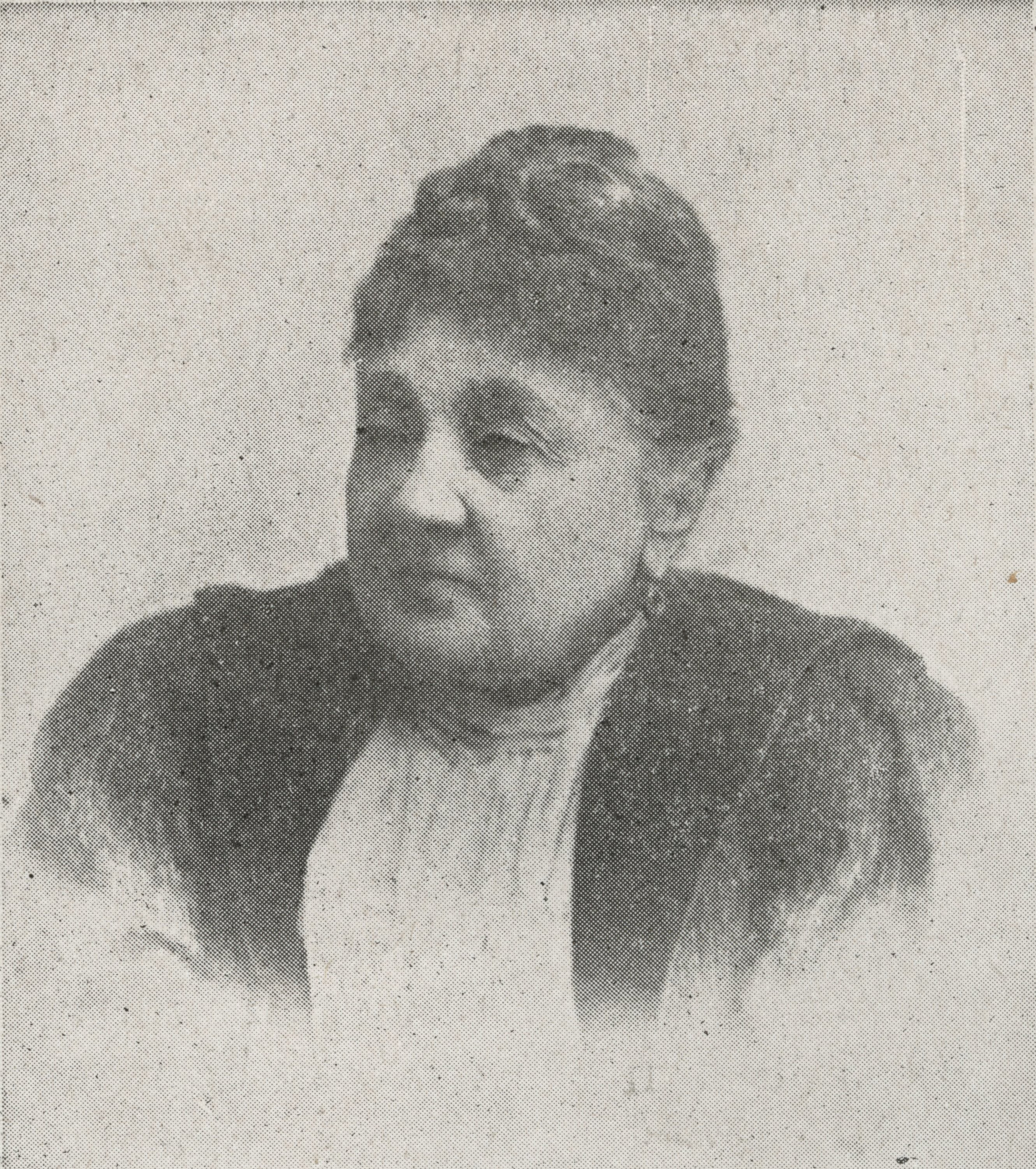
- Born: 17 October 1826; Warsaw, Kingdom of Poland
- Died: 26 February 1901 (aged 74); Warsaw, Kingdom of Poland
- Occupation: Cookbook writer

Lucyna von Bachman Ćwierczakiewiczowa (Polish pronunciation: [luˈt͡sɨna t͡ɕfʲert͡ʂakʲeviˈt͡ʂɔva]) (17 October 1826 — 26 February 1901) was a Polish journalist and author of Polish cookery books.

== Life and career ==
Ćwierczakiewiczowa was born Lucyna von Bachman in Warsaw, into an extravagant upper-class family. In 1858, she published her first book Jedyne praktyczne przepisy wszelkich zapasów spiżarnianych oraz pieczenia ciast (The only practical compendium of recipes for all household stocks and pastry baking). Her work was based both on her own culinary experience and on 17th century and 18th century memoirs by Polish nobles. In 1860 she published another cookbook 365 obiadów za pięć złotych (365 dinners for 5 zlotys).

In 1865 she started her own column in the Bluszcz weekly dealing with cuisine and fashion. She also collaborated with Kurier Warszawski, the most notable Warsaw-based newspaper of the time. In the 1870s, she published several other guides to cooking, cleaning and flower arrangement. She also began to invite many prominent figures to her salon at 3 Królewska Street. Among her guests were the most influential writers and journalists of her time, including Bolesław Prus.

Her books made her the most popular author in Poland. Before 1924, her first cook book was issued 23 times, with more than 130 thousand copies sold worldwide, more than all the books by Henryk Sienkiewicz and Bolesław Prus combined. Because of that, she became famous but was also mocked by many "serious" authors of the time. Her weight (more than 130 kilograms) and haughtiness gained her a nickname of Ćwierciakiewiczowa, an allusion to the Polish word ćwierć meaning a quarter. This nickname became so popular that nowadays her name is frequently misspelt, even in serious publications.

Since 1875, Ćwierczakiewiczowa devoted herself to preparing a yearly publication for women named Kolęda dla Gospodyń. It was a calendar filled with cooking recipes, women's suffrage propaganda and short novels and poems.

She died in Warsaw and is buried in the Protestant Reformed Cemetery in Warsaw. Her tombstone mistakenly shows her birthdate as 1829.

== See also ==
- Cuisine
- Polish cuisine
