= Władysław Edward Kronenberg =

Polish engineer, industrialist and composer of Jewish origin

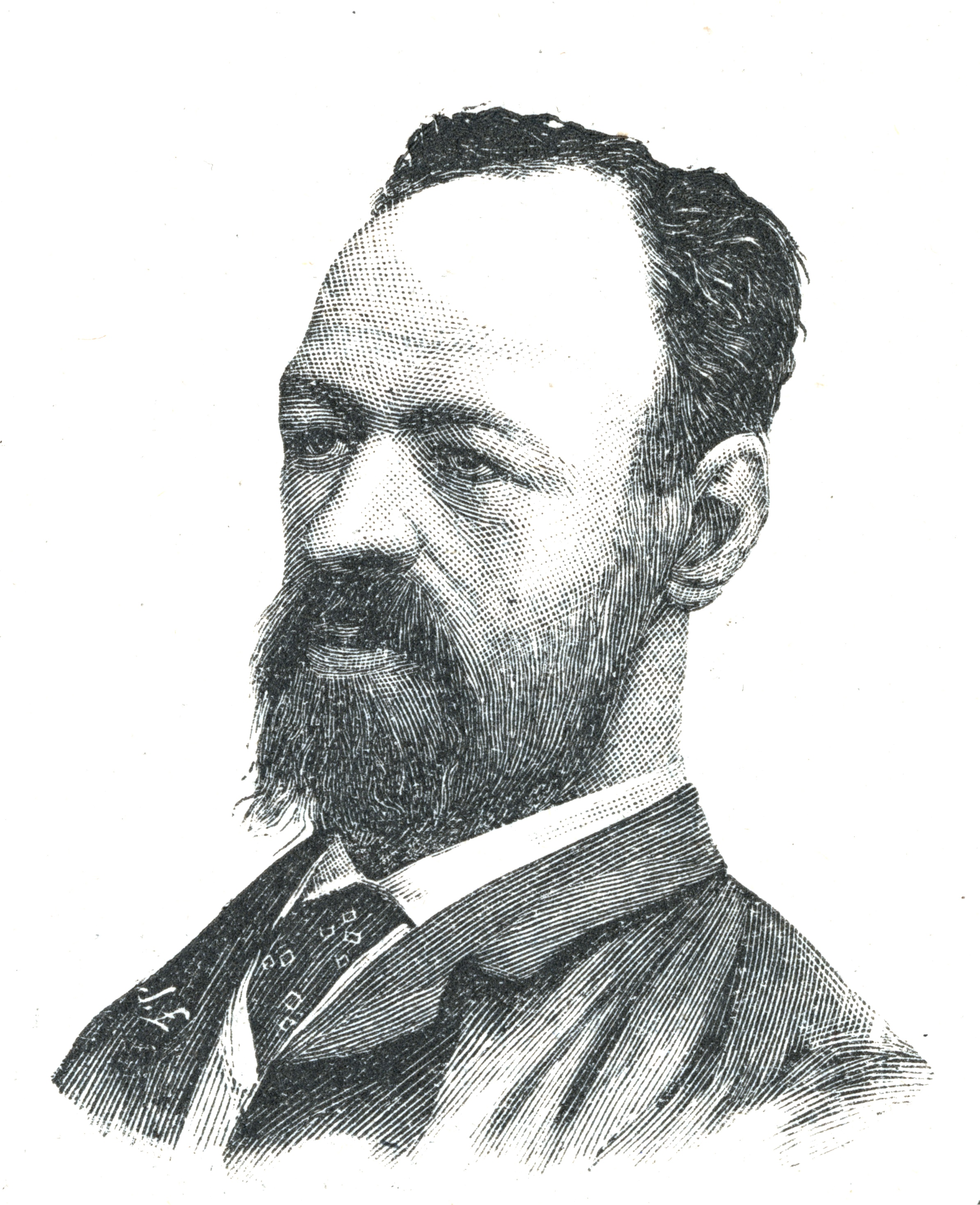

Władysław Edward Kronenberg (June 27, 1848 in Warsaw, Poland – April 16, 1892 in Cannes, France), Polish engineer, industrialist and composer of Jewish origin.

Władysław Edward Kronenberg was born as the son of a banker Leopold Stanisław Kronenberg (1812-1878) and Ernestine Rosalie Leo (1827-1893), daughter of Leopold August Leo. He had five siblings: Stanisław Leopold, Leopold Julian, Tekla Julia, Marię Różę, and Różę Marię Karolinę. His parents were both from families of Jewish origin, but were baptized in the Evangelical Reformed church, and brought up their children as such, including Wladyslaw.

He graduated from the Ecole Centrale in Paris. After returning to Poland, he became a member of the Warsaw-Tiraspol and Vistula railroads. He was the founder and publisher of the Warsaw Technical Review .

In 1883 in a village near Częstochowa he began the construction of a textile factory, which was soon after sold to the Austrian company Hielle and Ditrich, due to lack of profitability of the project. Finally, the factory under the name "Błeszno" was launched in 1885 and before the First World War was one of the biggest factories in the Kingdom of Poland.

After the failure in the construction of factories near Czestochowa, he abandoned industrial activity and settled in Paris, where he became a composer. He worked mostly on patriotic songs. In 1881, he founded the Warsaw Music Society and was its president until 1885.

He was married to Marguerite Lucie Chevreau (1859-1953), with whom he had a daughter Marię Władysławę (1882-1914), the wife of Joseph Raymond Anne Marie, Count de Maistre (1879-1955).

He died at Cannes and was buried in the cemetery of the Evangelical Reformed in Warsaw. The Warsaw Charity Society was left 250,000 rubles in his will.
