= Leopold Stanisław Kronenberg =

Polish banker, investor and financier

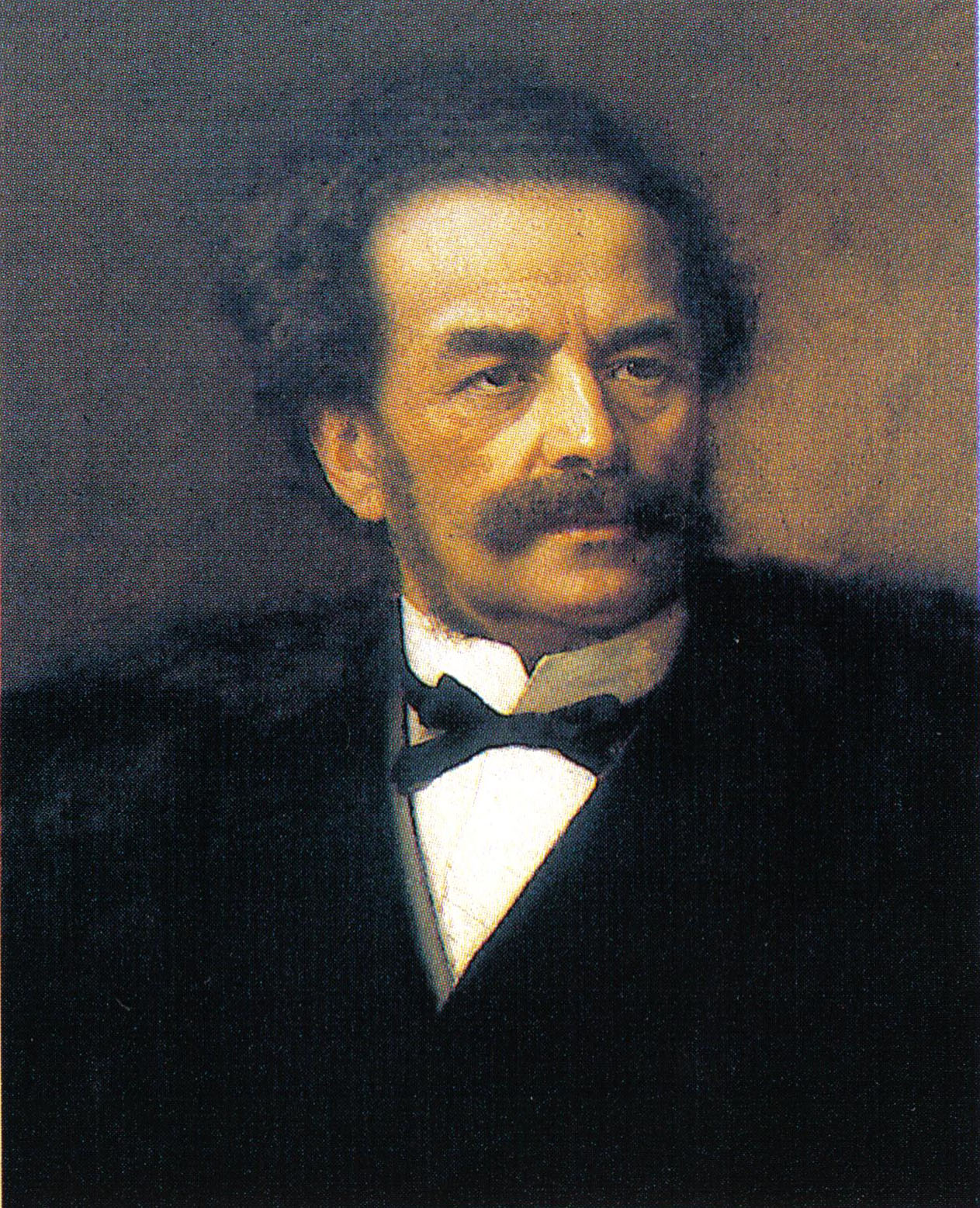
Portrait of Leopold Stanisław Kronenberg, by Leopold Horovitz (1837–1917)

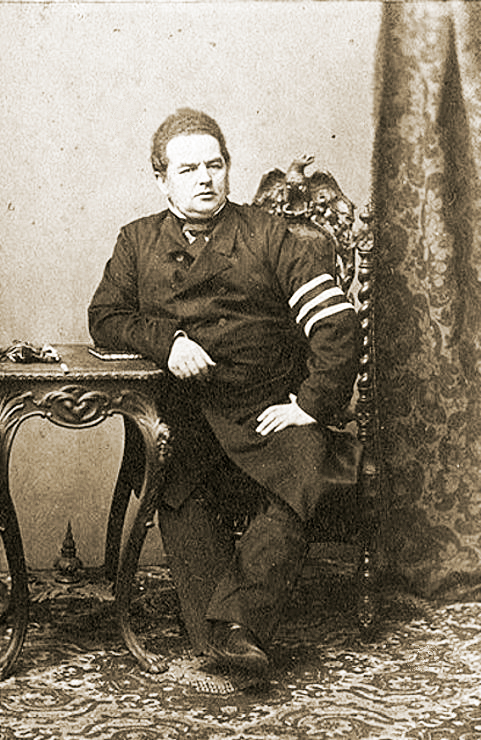
Photo of Leopold Kronenberg by Karol Beyer

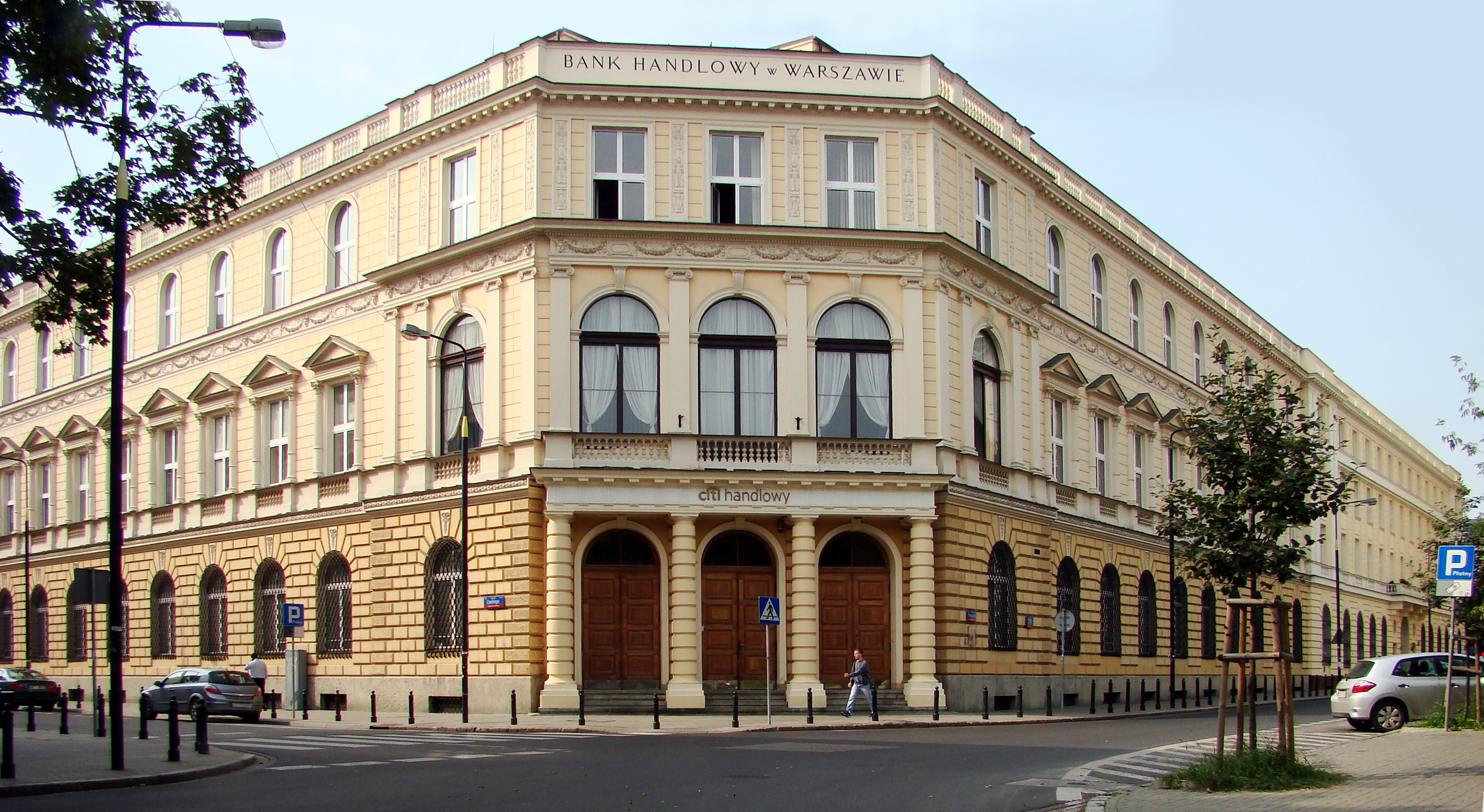
The historic headquarters of Bank Handlowy in Warsaw

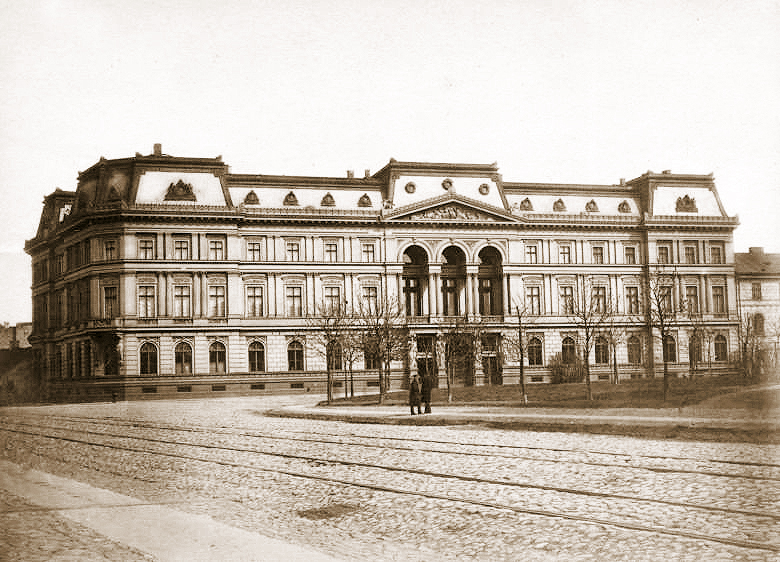
Kronenberg Palace in Warsaw, which was destroyed by fire in 1939

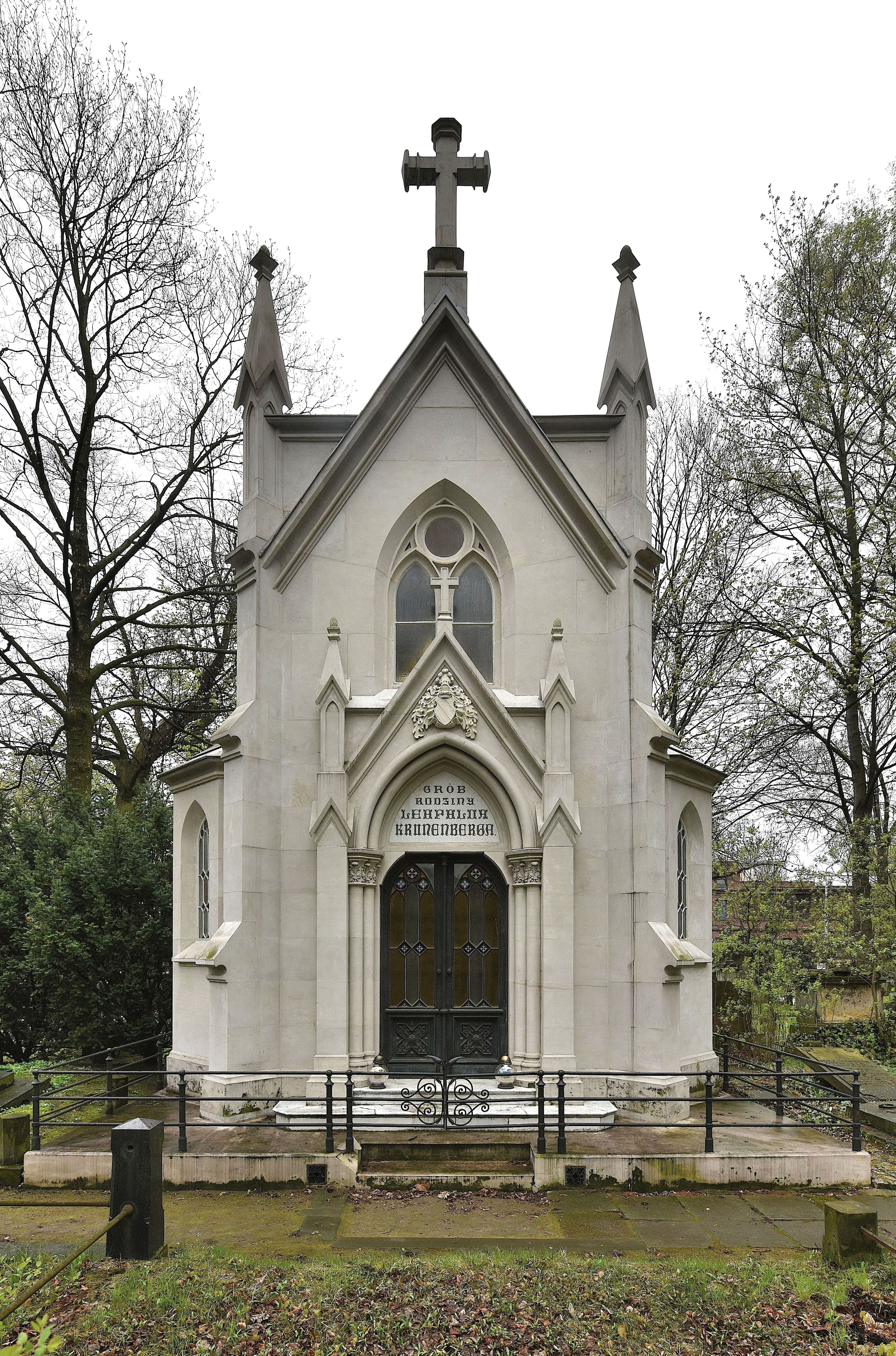
Leopold Stanisław Kronenberg's burial place, at Kronenberg Family Chapel in the Warsaw Reformed Cemetery

Leopold Stanisław Kronenberg (born 24 March 1812 in Warsaw, Duchy of Warsaw, died 5 April 1878 in Nice, France) was a Polish banker, investor, and financier, and a leader of the 1863 January uprising against the Russian Empire.

== Family ==
Kronenberg came from a wealthy family of Jewish rabbis. His father Samuel Eleazar Kronenberg (1773–1826) was a native of Wyszogród who led a small bank in Warsaw. His mother was Tekla (Theresa), née Levi (1775–1848).

Kronenberg had seven siblings: Ludwik, Rozalia, Stanislaw Solomon, Dorota (the mother of Seweryn Loewenstein), Maria, Henryk Andrzej Kronenberg (whose daughter Emilia married Polish industrialist Jan Gotlib Bloch, whose family had often been in competition with the Kronenbergs), and Władysław Alfons Kronenberg. His eldest sibling Ludwik (born Lewek or "Yehuda Arie Leib") was the only one whose family remained Jewish, while the other siblings each converted to Christianity.

After graduating from high school in Warsaw, Kronenberg studied at the University of Technology in Hamburg and at the University of Berlin. Having finished his studies in 1832, he returned to Poland and took up conducting business. In 1846 he converted from Judaism to Protestantism.

He married Ernestyna Rozalia Leo (1827–93), daughter of Leopold August Leo, a prominent Polish Jew who had converted to Lutheranism. They had six children: Stanisław Leopold (1846–94), entrepreneur; Władysław Edward (1848–92), musician and philanthropist; Leopold Julian (1849–1937), banker; Tekla Julia (1851–52); Maria Róża (1854–1944)—wife of Karol Zamoyski, and subsequently of Gustaw Taube—hostess of a famous Warsaw literary salon; and Rozalia (born 1857), wife of Aleksander Orsetti.

== Business ==
From 1839 to 1860, having obtained the concession of the tobacco monopoly in the Kingdom of Poland, Kronenberg amassed a considerable fortune which he used to develop the country's economy: sugar industry, construction of railways, commercial activities, and banking sectors. He was also involved in the rural economy by participating in the work of the Agricultural Society. In 1859, Leopold Kronenberg made his entry into the world of the press by buying the newspaper Gazeta Codzienna, renamed in 1861 as Gazeta Polska. It was a magazine with a liberal-democratic tint, whose editor was Józef Ignacy Kraszewski.

Kronenberg was an instigator of and a financial supporter of the January uprising of 1863 against the Russians. To avoid arrest by the Russians, he fled to Dresden in June of that year. After the failure of this revolt, he became a representative of the "white" faction that favored a compromise with the Russians. In 1870, Kronenberg founded Bank Handlowy, the commercial bank of Warsaw, and in 1875 he founded the Warsaw School of Economics. He also founded the Credit Corporation of Warsaw, Industrial Cashier, Warsaw Fire Insurance Company, Coal Mine Association and Metallurgical Works.

He was a shareholder in mining, metallurgical and sugar companies. He built many sugar factories, and in 1870 was the initiator of the establishment of the Warsaw Sugar Factory Association. He was a member of the National Debt Relief Commission, the Industrial Council of the Government Commission for Internal Affairs, and the Ministry of the Interior of the Kingdom of Poland. He was a member of the board of the Warsaw Stock Exchange, the Senior Merchants' Assembly, the chairman of the Warsaw-Tiraspol Railway Management Board. He was the president of the Warsaw Philanthropic Society.

Between 1868 and 1871, he built in Warsaw a monumental home, Kronenberg Palace, which burned in September 1939 and was dismantled in the 1960s.

Kronenberg died in 1878 in Nice. He was buried in the Kronenberg family chapel at the Evangelical-Reformed Cemetery in Warsaw.

== See also ==
- List of Poles

== Bibliography ==
- Jadwiga i Eugeniusz Szulcowie, Cmentarz Ewangelicko-Reformowany w Warszawie, Warszawa 1989
- K.Bem, Reformowani Konwertyci, Jednota 7-8/2007
- Kazimierz Reychman: Szkice genealogiczne, Serja I. Warszawa: Hoesick F., 1936, s. 111–115.

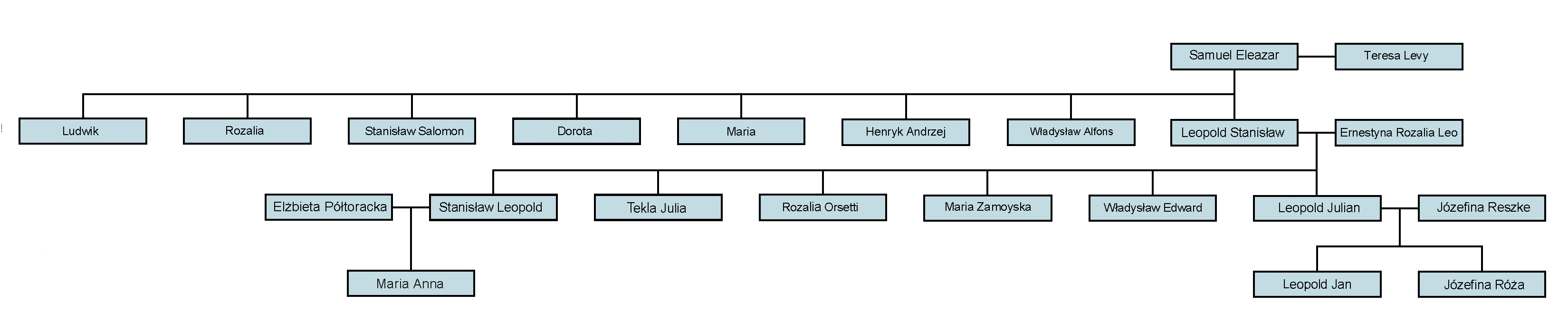
The Kronenberg Family
