= Henry Kronenberg =

American physician and academic

Henry Kronenberg (fl. 2000s) is an American physician and academic. As of 2006 he is the immediate past Division Head of Endocrinology at the Massachusetts General Hospital in Boston, MA and a Professor of Medicine at the Harvard Medical School. He is noted for his work on parathyroid hormone and the use of genetic mouse models to understand the role of parathyroid hormone and parathyroid hormone-related protein in the regulation of bone formation and remodeling. He graduated from Harvard College and Columbia Medical School.

== Accomplishments ==
Dr. Kronenberg has made a series of fundamental observations of importance to the understanding of how several peptides regulate the formation and remodeling of bone. These include the cloning of a cDNA for parathyroid hormone, the identification of a role for parathyroid hormone-related protein in endochondral ossification through Indian hedgehog (IHH) activation, and studies that identified a role for parathyroid hormone in the regulation of the bone marrow stem cell niche.

He has served as the President of the American Society for Bone and Mineral Research and the Endocrine Society. He was a member of the Board of Advisors of the Rolanette and Berdon Lawrence Bone Disease Program of Texas from 2006-2012. In 2024, he was elected to the National Academy of Sciences
