= Kazimierz Reychman =

Polish diplomat

Kazimierz Reychman (1 November 1882 – 16 August 1936 in Warsaw) was a Polish diplomat of Jewish origin.

He was the son of Nicholas and Anna Chocimska. He served as vice-consul of the Republic in Buenos Aires, then consul of the Republic in Rio de Janeiro.

He was the brother of Stanislaus (an engineer, co-founder of the Association of Polish Electrical Engineers), Eugenia, and Wanda Justyna.

On 2 October 1907 he married Wandą Olszewicz, whom he divorced on 6 March 1924. From the marriage he had two sons: Stefan Adolf (engineer) and Jan Antoni.

== Publications ==
- Kazimierz Reychman Nieznane ex-librisy polskie, Warszawa : [s.n.], 1910 (Warszawa : P. Laskauer).
- Kazimierz Reychman Thomas Caietan de Wengierski et son ex-libris, Paris : Libr. Héraldique H. Daragon, 1921.
- Kazimierz Reychman Bibljografja polskiego ekslibrisu : 1874-1925, Kraków : Wydaw. Drukarni Narodowej, 1925 (Kraków : Drukarnia Narodowa).
- Kazimierz Reychman Dodatki i sprostowania do exlibrisów bibljotek polskich XVI-XIX wieku Wiktora Wittyga, Kraków : [s.n.], 1925 (Kraków : Druk.Narodowa).
- Kazimierz Reychman Ex-librisy gdańskie, Warszawa : nakł. aut., 1928 (Warszawa : Wł. Łazarski).
- Kazimierz Reychman Dział polski w zbiorze exlibrisów British Museum; Sprzedaż księgozbioru ś. p. Edwarda Neprosa; Księgozbiór loży wolnomularskiej, Kraków : [s.n.], 1930 (Kraków : W. L. Anczyc).
- Kazimierz Reychman Bibljografja polskiego ekslibrisu, Warszawa : Wydaw. Tow. Miłośników Exlibrisów, 1932 (Kraków : Druk. Ludowa).
- Kazimierz Reychman Nagrobki polskie na cmentarzach moskiewskich, Warszawa : [s.n.], 1935 (Warszawa : L. Nowak).
- Kazimierz Reychman Szkice genealogiczne, Serja I., Warszawa: Hoesick F., 1936.
