= Samuel Eleazar Kronenberg =

Polish-Jewish banker and industrialist

Samuel Eleazer Kronenberg (né Lejzor Hirszowicz Kronenberg; 1773–1826) was a Polish-Jewish banker and industrialist. The son of Hirsz Kronenberg, he was also a brother of Anna Maria Kronenberżanka Breslauerowa (1781-1853).

Originally from Wyszogród, he later moved to Warsaw and founded the S. L. Kronenberg Bank. He had thirteen children with his wife, Tekla Teresa (née Lewyanka) Kronenberżyna (1775-1848). Eight of their children, including five sons, survived.

Among the surviving sons was Leopold Stanisław Kronenberg (1812-1878), who became a Crypto-Jewish Calvinist in order to maintain economic security. Leopold and several other siblings became bankers and important figures in Polish politics, and several of his children married into other aristocratic families and banking families, including the Bloch family.

Another of Samuel's sons was Henryk Andrzej Kronenberg, who became a medical doctor, and who converted to Roman Catholicism. Another was Władysław Alfons Kronenberg, who held various positions in the treasury apparatus of the Kingdom of Poland, including serving for a decade as the head of the Government Administration of Revenues (Administracji Rządowej Dochodów Skarbowych).

Only Samuel's eldest son, Ludwik Kronenberg (né "Lewek" or "Yehuda Arie Leib", 1783–1882), remained Jewish.
