= Jan Gotlib Bloch =

Polish banker (1836–1902)

- Иван Станиславович Блиох
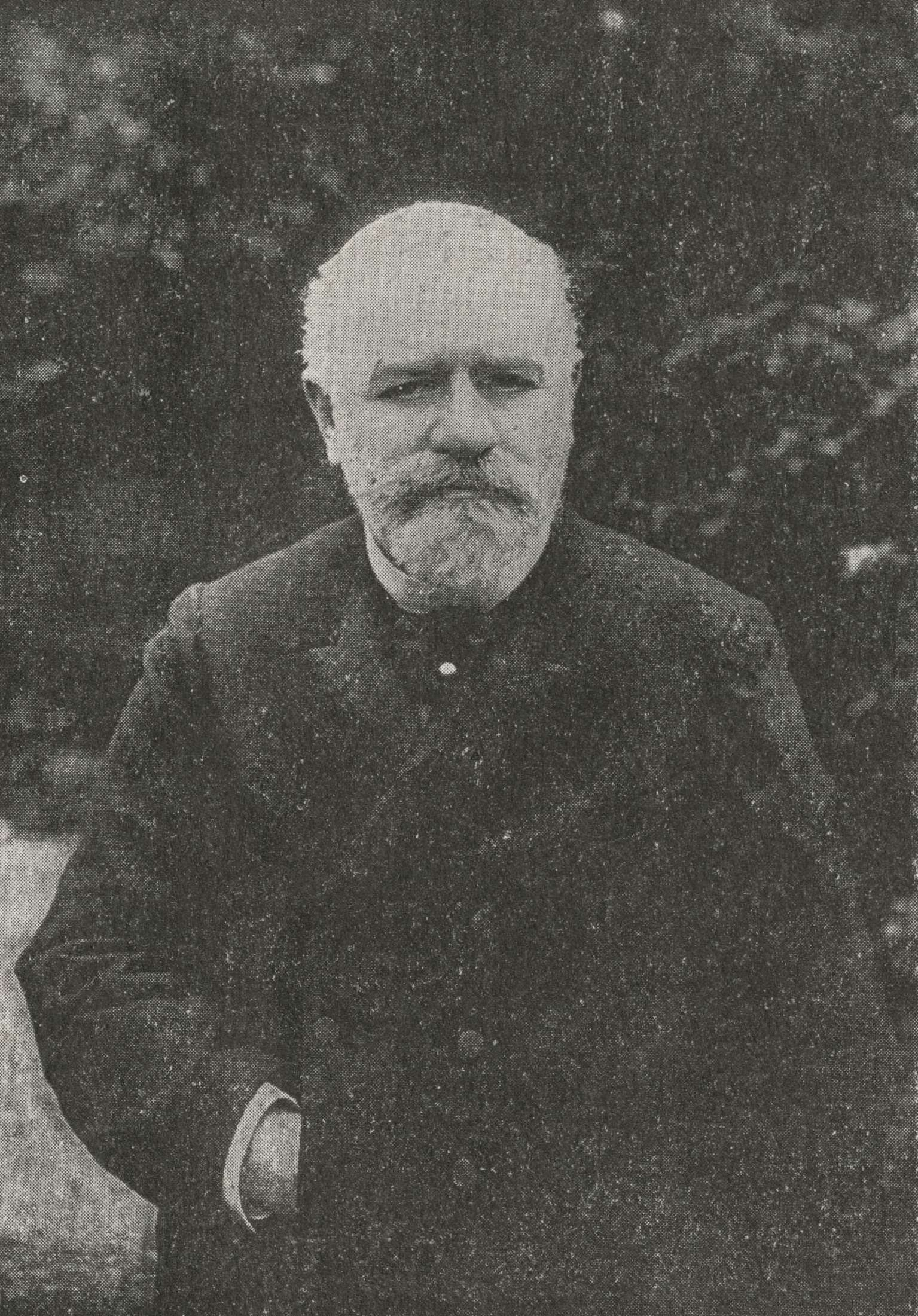
- Bloch, c. 1902
- Born: 24 July 1836; Radom, Congress Poland, Russian Empire
- Died: 7 January 1902 (aged 65); Warsaw, Congress Poland, Russian Empire

Jan Gotlib "Bogumił" Bloch (Russian: Иван Станиславович Блиох or Блох; 24 July 1836 – 7 January 1902) was a Polish banker and railway financier who devoted his private life to the study of modern industrial warfare. Born Jewish and a convert to Calvinism, he went to considerable lengths to oppose the prevalent antisemitic policies of the Tsarist government in Congress Poland, and was sympathetic to the fledgling Zionist movement.

Bloch had studied at the University of Berlin, worked at a Warsaw bank and then moved to Saint Petersburg, capital of the Russian Empire (which governed much of the Polish lands at the time). There, he took part in the development of the Russian Railways, both in financing the construction of new railways and in writing research papers on the subject. He founded several banking, credit and insurance companies. In 1877, he was appointed a member of the Russian Finance Ministry's Scientific Committee.

Bloch was married to Emilia Julia Kronenberg H. Koroniec (1845–1921), the granddaughter of Polish banker Samuel Eleazar Kronenberg, daughter of medical doctor Henryk Andrzej Kronenberg and niece of industrialist and Polish nationalist Leopold Stanisław Kronenberg; the Kronenberg and Bloch families had often been in competition with each other in several 19th-century Polish businesses.

== Life ==
Born in Radom, Poland, on 24 July 1836, Bloch became intrigued by the victory of the North German Confederation over France in the Franco-Prussian War of 1870–1871, which suggested to him that the solution of diplomatic problems by warfare had become obsolete in Europe. He published his six-volume master work, Budushchaya voina i yeyo ekonomicheskie posledstviya (Russian: Будущая война и её экономические последствия, Future War and its Economic Consequences), popularized in English translation as Is War Now Impossible?, in Paris in 1898.

His detailed analysis of modern warfare, its tactical, strategic, and political implications, was widely read in Europe. Bloch argued that:

- The new technologies of smokeless powder, magazine rifles, machine guns, and quick-firing artillery had rendered manoeuvres over open ground, such as bayonet and cavalry charges, obsolete. Bloch concluded that a war between the great powers would be a war of entrenchment and that rapid attacks and decisive victories were a thing of the past. He calculated that entrenched men would enjoy a fourfold advantage over infantry in the open.
- Industrial societies would have to settle a stalemate by committing million-man armies. An enormous battlefront would develop. A war of this type could not be resolved quickly.
- Such a war would become a duel of industrial might, a matter of total economic attrition. Severe economic and social dislocations would result in the imminent risk of famine, disease, the "break-up of the whole social organization", and revolutions from below.

== Influence ==
Bloch attended the first Hague Peace Conference in 1899, possibly at the invitation of Tsar Nicholas II, and distributed copies of his work to delegates from the diplomatic missions of 26 states, to little avail. The British publicist W. T. Stead also worked to spread Bloch's insights. In each particular, Bloch's theoretical research was rejected or ignored. To the British readers of The Contemporary Review, Bloch wrote in 1901:

Having busied myself for over fourteen years with the study of war in all its phases and aspects, I am astonished to find that the remarkable evolution which is rapidly turning the sword into a ploughshare has passed almost unnoticed even by the professional watchmen who are paid to keep a sharp look-out. In my work on the war of the future I endeavoured to draw a picture of this interesting process. But writing for specialists, I was compelled to enter largely into details, the analysis of which ran into 3,084 pages. The facts which are there garnered together, and the consequences which flow from them, run too strongly counter to the vested interests of the most powerful class of the community to admit of their being immediately embodied in measures of reform. And this I foresaw from the first. What I could not foresee was the stubbornness which [it] not only recoiled from taking action but set itself to twist and distort the facts. Patriotism is highly respectable, but it is dangerous to identify it with the interests of a class. The steadfastness with which the military caste clings to the memory of a state of things which has already died is pathetic and honourable. Unfortunately it is also costly and dangerous. Therefore I venture now to appeal to the British masses, whose vital interests are at stake and whose verdict must be final.

Europe's patriots were unmoved. French cavalry and British infantry commanders only learned Bloch's lessons by a process of trial and error once Bloch's impossible war, World War I, had begun. The Russian and German monarchies proved equally incapable of assimilating Bloch's cautionary words concerning revolution, paying the price with summary execution and exile, respectively.

Bloch's foresight is somewhat qualified by what proved an underestimation of the tactical and strategic significance of indirect (e.g., artillery) fire, and his failure to foresee the development of the armoured tank and military aircraft. Bloch also did not realise the potential of non-rail motor-transport. None of these oversights was significant enough to undermine his broadest observations, however, for the period before about 1930.

He died on 7 January 1902 in Warsaw. An International Museum of War and Peace was established at Lucerne, Switzerland, in Bloch's name in the same year. The museum closed in 1919 due to a lack of visitors

== Role in contemporary theory ==
Bloch survived long enough after publishing his theory to turn his analytical talents to investigating the institutional barriers which prevented the theory's adoption by the military establishment. He appears to have concluded that the military had to be sidestepped, by a more direct appeal to voters.

Contemporary theory treats Bloch as the Carl von Clausewitz of the early 1900s. A review in 2000 in the journal War in History concentrates on the interaction between Bloch's theory and the military professionals of the time. In short, it finds that they tended to dismiss Bloch, on the basis that, while his "mathematics" might be correct, his overall message ran the risk of being bad for morale.

== Confronting antisemitism ==
Bloch converted to Calvinism, the religion of a small minority in the Russian Empire. In this way he was able to avoid the legal disabilities imposed on Jews under Tsarist rule, especially the geographical limitation to the Pale of Settlement, banning Jews from living in the Empire's main cities — without needing to regularly attend a church and be visibly practising Christianity. As became evident especially in the later part of his life, he retained a strong concern for the situation of the Jews.

Following the wave of pogroms of the 1880s and the early 1890s, a commission headed by the virulently antisemitic Interior Minister Vyacheslav von Plehve recommended a further worsening of the Jews' legal position. In response, Bloch sent to the government a series of well-reasoned memoranda calling for an end to the discrimination of the Jews.

Bloch also embarked upon an extensive research on the social and economic conditions of the Russian Empire's Jewish subjects. For that purpose, he established a team of scientific researchers headed by the Russian economist A. P. Subotin, on whose work he spent hundreds of thousands of rubles.

The result, completed in 1901, was a five-volume work entitled "Comparison of the Material and Moral well-being of the Western, Great Russian and Vistula Provinces". On the basis of extensive statistical data, compiled mainly in the Pale of Settlement, he gave a comprehensive account of the Jewish role in the empire's economic life, in crafts, trade and industry. The study showed that the Jews were a boon to the Russian economy - rather than damaging and threatening it, as was at the time regularly claimed by antisemites.

Bloch's great effort was, however, in vain. The Russian Council of Ministers banned the work, and nearly all copies were confiscated and burned. Only a few surviving copies remained in circulation, as great rarities. Subotin was, however, later able to publish a summary entitled "The Jewish Question in the Right Light".

== Sympathy to Zionism ==
Since 1897, Bloch became involved with Zionist activities in Russia, and became friendly with Theodor Herzl. In June 1899, Herzl arrived at the Hague Peace Conference in an effort to gain an audience with the Tsar, for which purpose he met with Bloch as with other people having access to higher echelons of the Russian government. Bloch supported Herzl's efforts and telegraphed a memorandum of recommendation to the Tsar via Baron de Staal. Bloch noted that Herzl had been active to promote the Hague Conference's aims of international peace, and that among other things he had sent a letter to Frederick I, Grand Duke of Baden calling for a change in Germany's position on the issue of international arbitration.

In June 1899, Bloch, at Herzl's request, lobbied the Russian government to lift a ban on the sale in its territory of shares of the Zionist Jewish Colonial Trust (predecessor of the present Israeli National Bank).

== See also ==
- The Great Illusion
- Historic recurrence
- List of Poles
