= Evangelical Reformed Cemetery, Warsaw =

Protestant cemetery in Poland

Protestant Reformed Cemetery in Warsaw
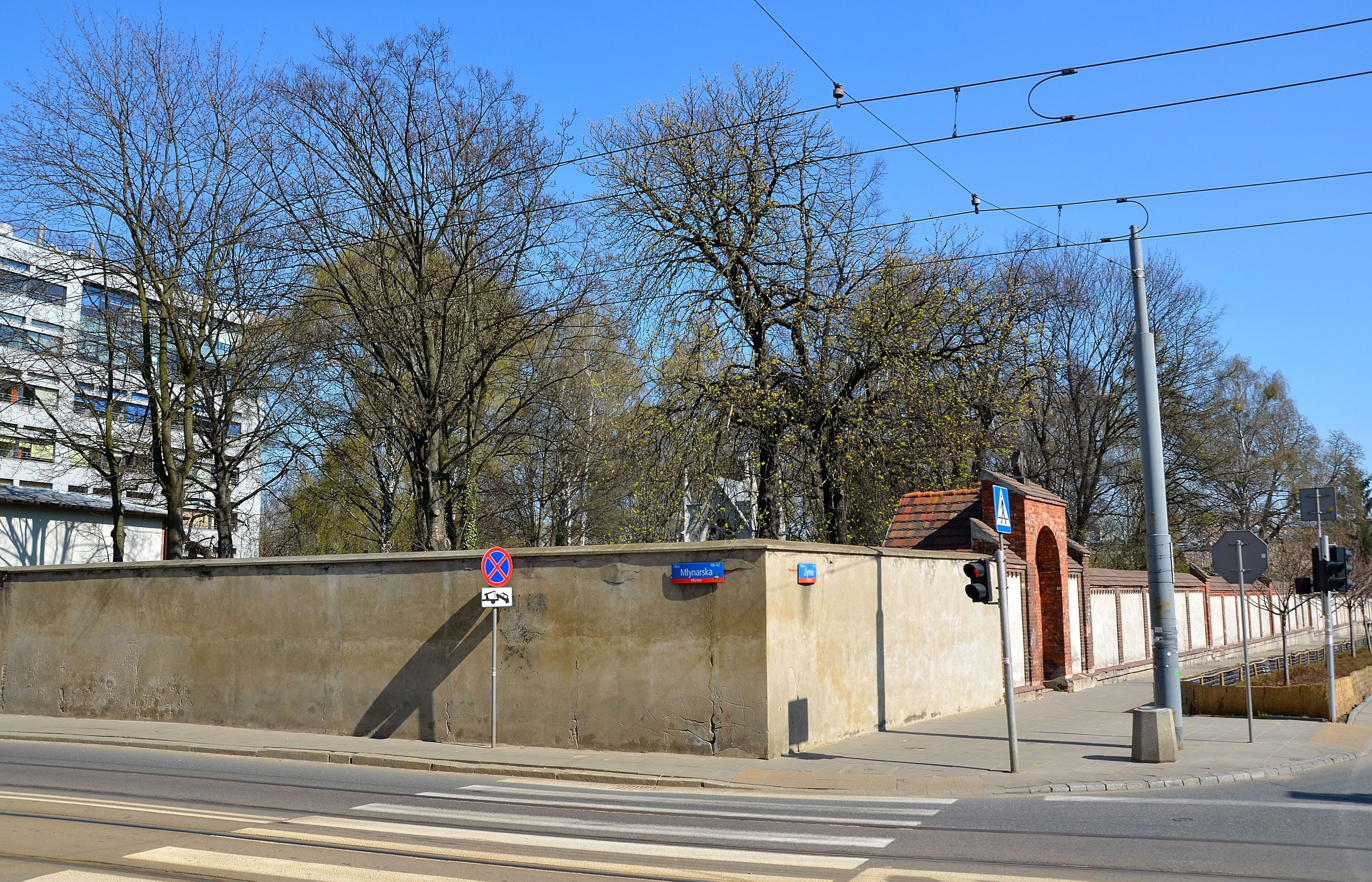
- Interactive map of Protestant Reformed Cemetery in Warsaw

Details
- Established: 1792
- Location: Warsaw
- Country: Poland
- Coordinates: 52°14′22″N 20°58′23″E
- Type: Calvinist–Protestant cemetery
- Website: Official website
- Find a Grave: Protestant Reformed Cemetery in Warsaw

The Evangelical Reformed Cemetery in Warsaw (Polish: Cmentarz ewangelicko-reformowany) is a historic Calvinist Protestant cemetery in Wola, a district in the west of Warsaw, Poland.

== Details ==
The cemetery was established in 1792 and is located in the Wola district. The cemetery bore witness to many historical events: fighting on its premises took place during the Kościuszko Uprising of 1794, the November Uprising (1830–1831) and the Warsaw Uprising (1944). The fence, the monuments and the architecture of the cemetery were all destroyed during the last of the afore-mentioned events, and were rebuilt in the second half of the 20th century. Despite the historical turmoil, many monuments of great artistic value have somehow managed to survive and still stand today - one of them being the Kronenberg Chapel, which is included in the National Historical Monument Register.

The Evangelical Reformed Cemetery is maintained by the Polish Reformed Church, but the cemetery is ecumenical and accepts interments from other Protestant denominations and members of the Church of England (Anglicans).

A monument dedicated to those killed during the Nazi occupation of Poland is made out of the rubble of destroyed tombstones.

== Selected notable burials ==
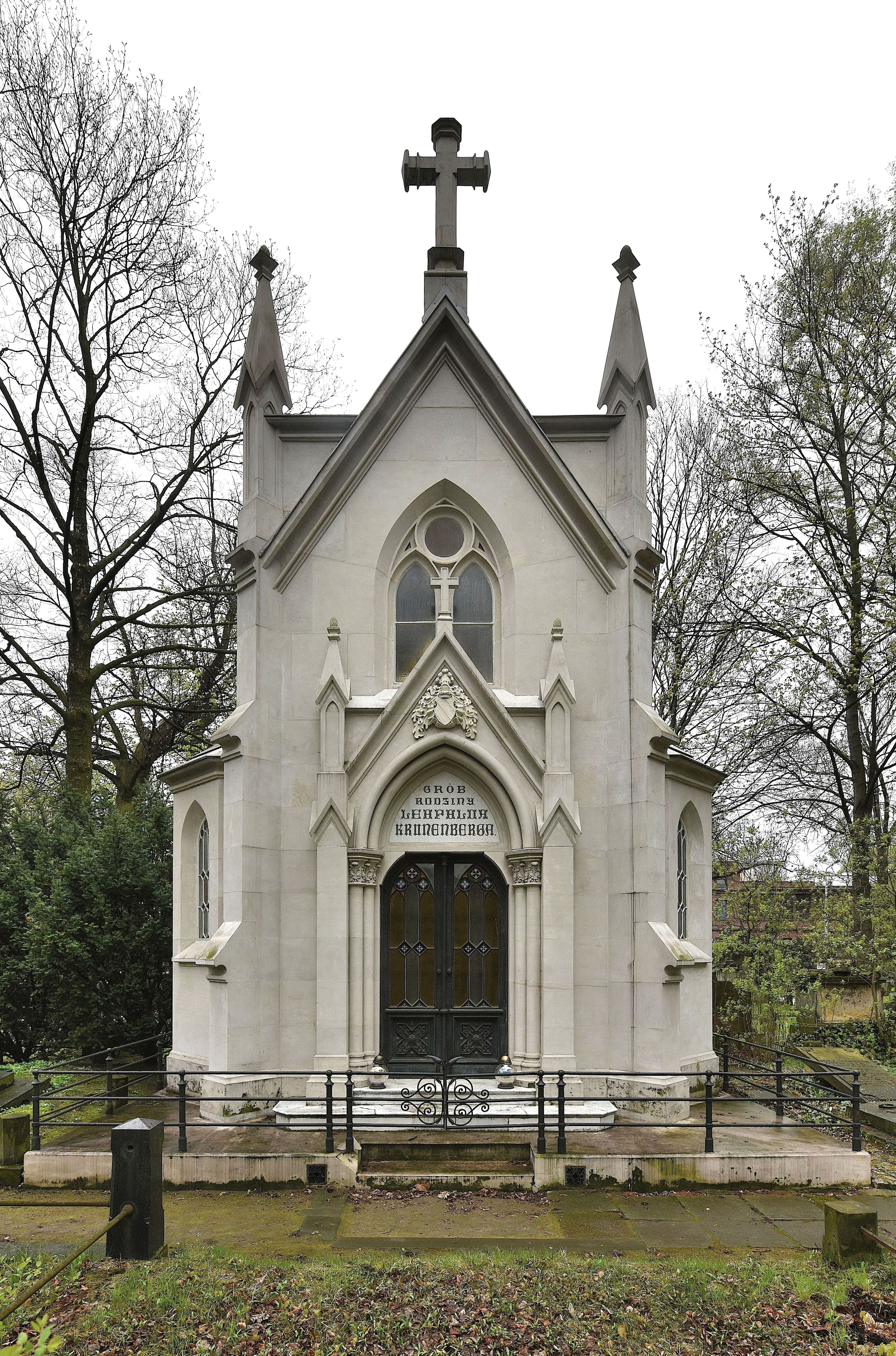
Kronenberg family Mausoleum

A few of the notables buried here are:

- Salomon Musonius (1724–1790), the first provost of the Polish Reformed Church parish in Warsaw
- Katarzyna Sowińska (1776–1860), the wife of General Józef Sowiński (killed in the November Uprising)
- Ludwik Wincenty Norblin (1836–1914), notable Polish entrepreneur
- Lucyna Ćwierczakiewiczowa (1829–1901), writer, journalist and author of Polish cookery books
- Stanisław Kronenberg (1846–1894), Polish financier
- Jeremi Przybora (1915–2004), Polish poet, writer, actor and singer
- Stefan Żeromski (1864–1925), Polish writer
- Anna German (1936–1982), Polish singer of German/Dutch origin singer
- Józef Simmler (1823–1868), Polish painter and artist
- Jan Baudouin de Courtenay (1845–1929), Polish linguist

== Gallery ==
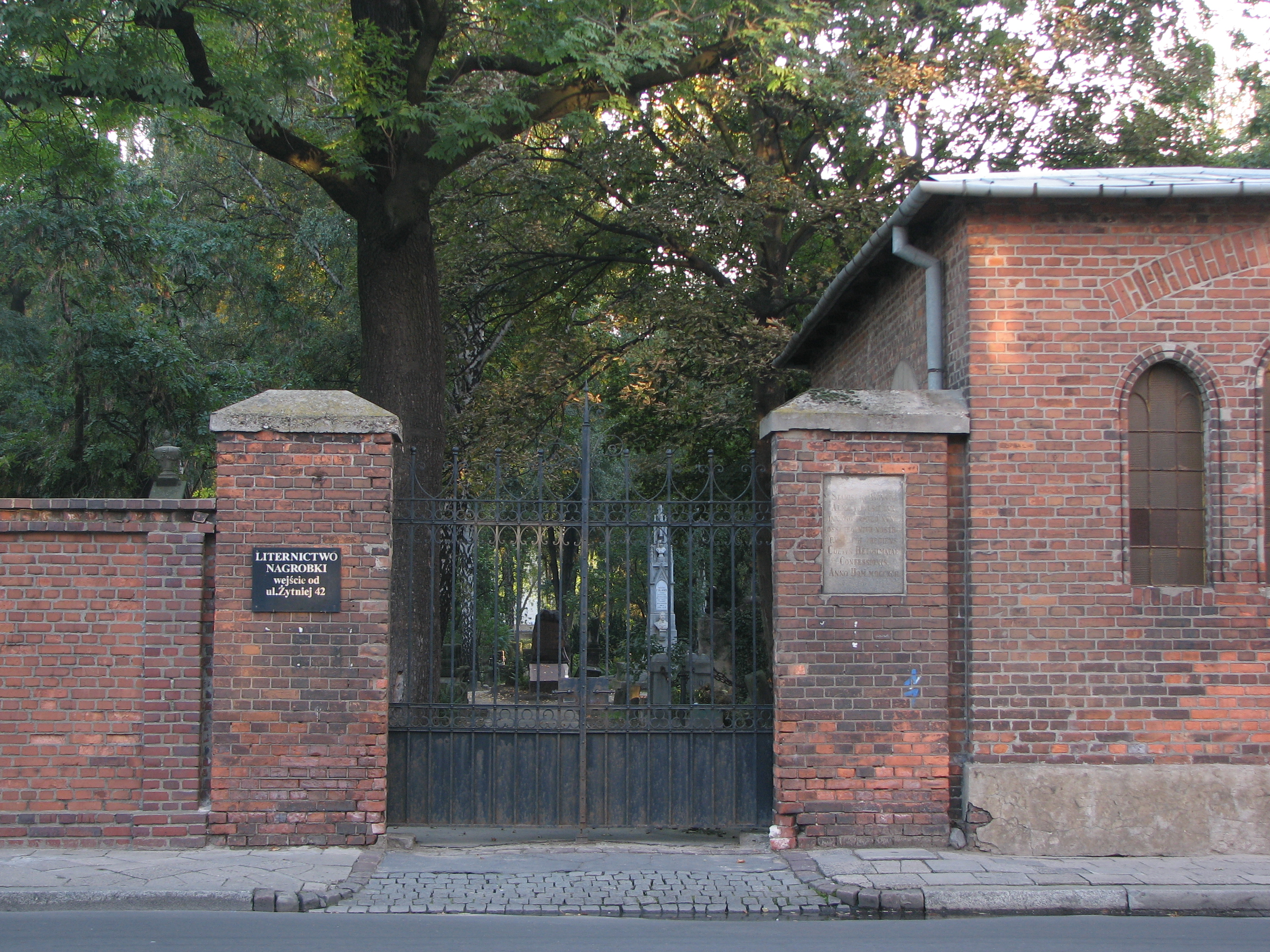

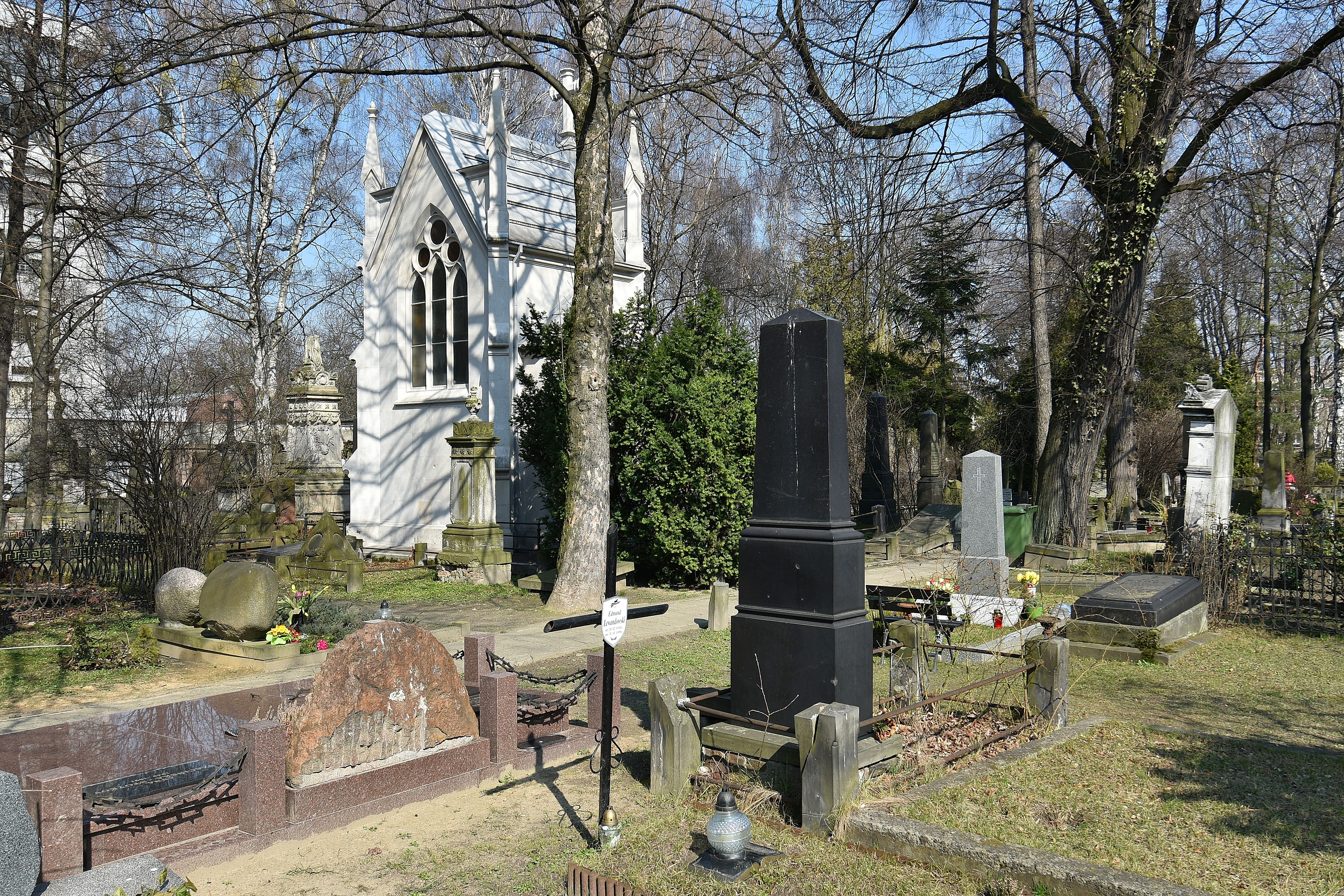

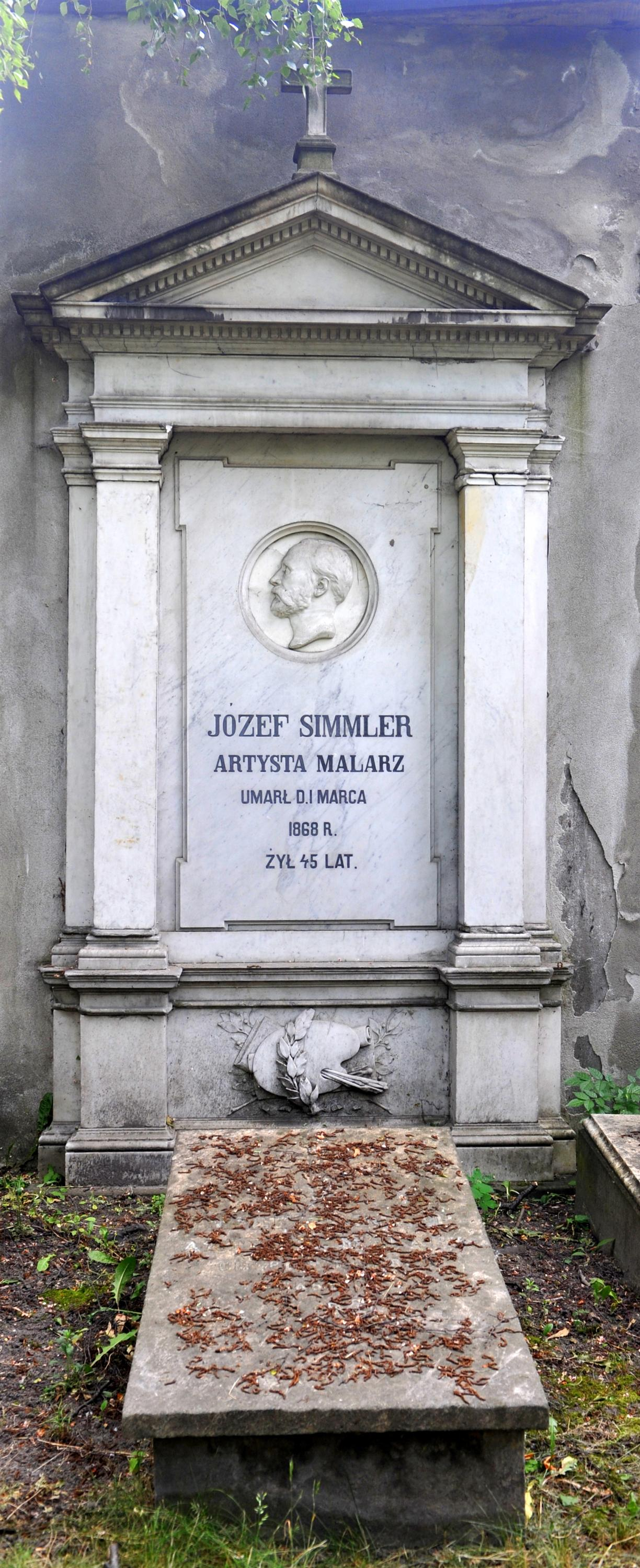

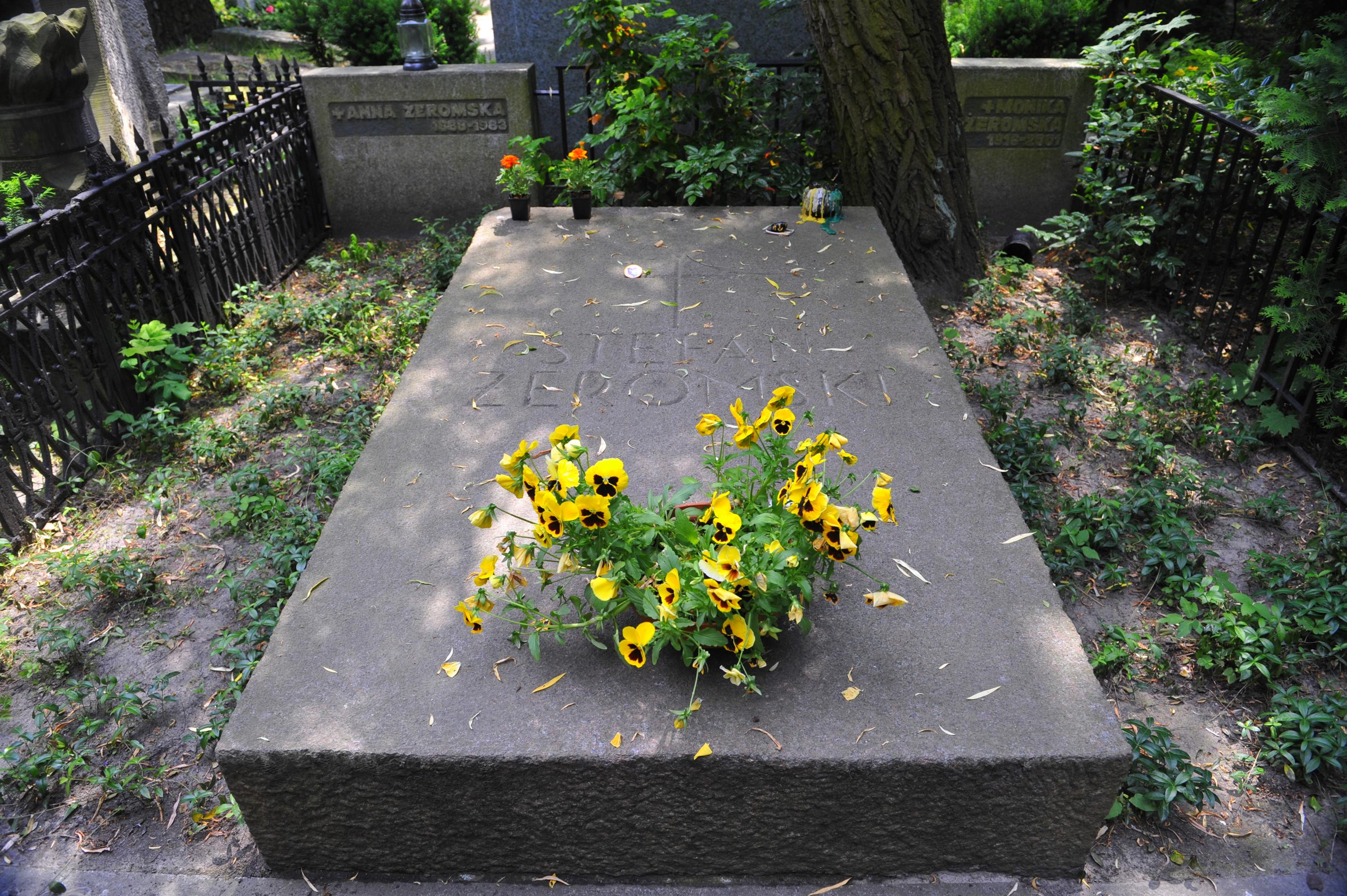

== See also ==
- Polish Reformed Church
- Evangelical–Augsburg Cemetery, Warsaw, neighbouring necropolis
