= Stanisław Kronenberg =

Polish financier (1846–1894)

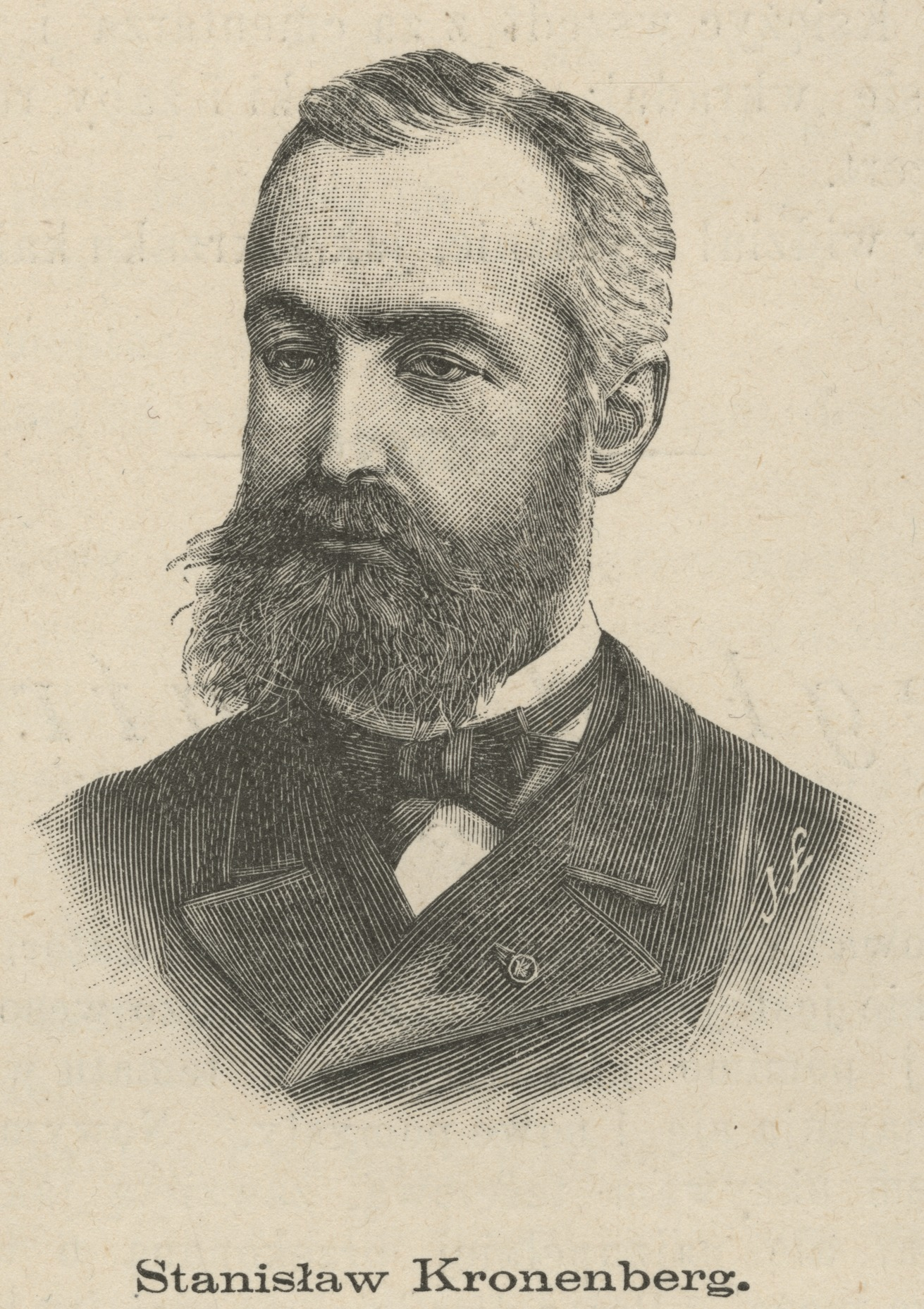

Stanisław Leopold Kronenberg (12 December 1846 in Warsaw – 4 April 1894 in Warsaw), was a Polish financier.

== Life ==
He was born the son of banker and railroad tycoon Leopold Stanisław Kronenberg (1812-1878) and his wife Ernestine Rozalia Leo (1827-1893), the daughter of Leopold Augustus Leo. Both parents came from Jewish families which had converted to Protestantism—the Kronenbergs, to Calvinism.

He had five siblings: Władysław Edward, Baron Leopold Julian Kronenberg (1849–1937), Tekla Julia Kronenberg, Marie Roze Kronenberg, and Roze Marie Karoline Kronenberg.

After graduating from gymnasium, he went to France. For two years he studied political economy and finance, and was granted at Paris the degree of Doctor of Philosophy. During the Franco-Prussian War he took part in the defense of Paris, retiring with the rank of lieutenant and the cross of the Legion of Honor.

Upon the death of his father in 1878, he returned to Warsaw, and assumed the management of his commercial and railroad interests. He was made president of the Tiraspol and Upper Vistula lines, director of the Vienna line, president of the Bank of Commerce, and director of various other commercial institutions; and was concerned in the publication of Gazeta Polska (The Polish Gazette), Nowiny (News, edited by Aleksander Świętochowski, then for a year by Bolesław Prus) and Biblioteka Umiejętności Prawnych. He was also active in the sugar industry.

He was married to Elizabeth Półtoracką, with whom he had a prenuptial legally recognized daughter Maria Anna, whose husband was Marie Jehan Bourrée Marc Philibert Comte de Corberon. He was buried beside his parents and other family members in the family vault at Protestant Reformed Cemetery in Warsaw.

== Literary works ==
His writings on economy and finance, written in Polish, appeared in the "Economist".

He also wrote:

- "Campagne", 1870–71
- "Quelques Souvenirs et Appréciations d'ex-Officier d'Infanterie", Paris, 1871.

== See also ==
- List of Poles
