= Leopold Augustus Leo =

Polish ophthalmologist

Leopold Augustus Leo (born 19 April 1794; died 19 June 1868 in Warsaw) was a Polish ophthalmologist of Jewish origin.

The son of Zygmunt and Zofia Hertz, Leopold August Leo graduated from the University of Königsberg in East Prussia and received his doctorate of medicine. Around 1815 he moved to Warsaw, where he practiced medicine. In the years 1838-1841 he was head of 'Instytut Oftalmiczny' (the Ophthalmic Institute) in Warsaw. He published numerous scientific papers.

He married Julianna Levy-Lyon (1801-1861), with whom he had five children: Josepha Amalie (1824-1902, wife of Stanisław Solomon Kronenberg), Ernestine Rozalie (1826-1893, wife of Leopold Stanisław Kronenberg), Edward Wiktor (1828-1901, lawyer and publicist), Anna (1829-1830), and Ludwik Filip (born 1831).

He was buried in the cemetery of the Evangelical-Augsburg Church in Warsaw.
