= Leopold Julian Kronenberg =

Polish banker (1849–1937)

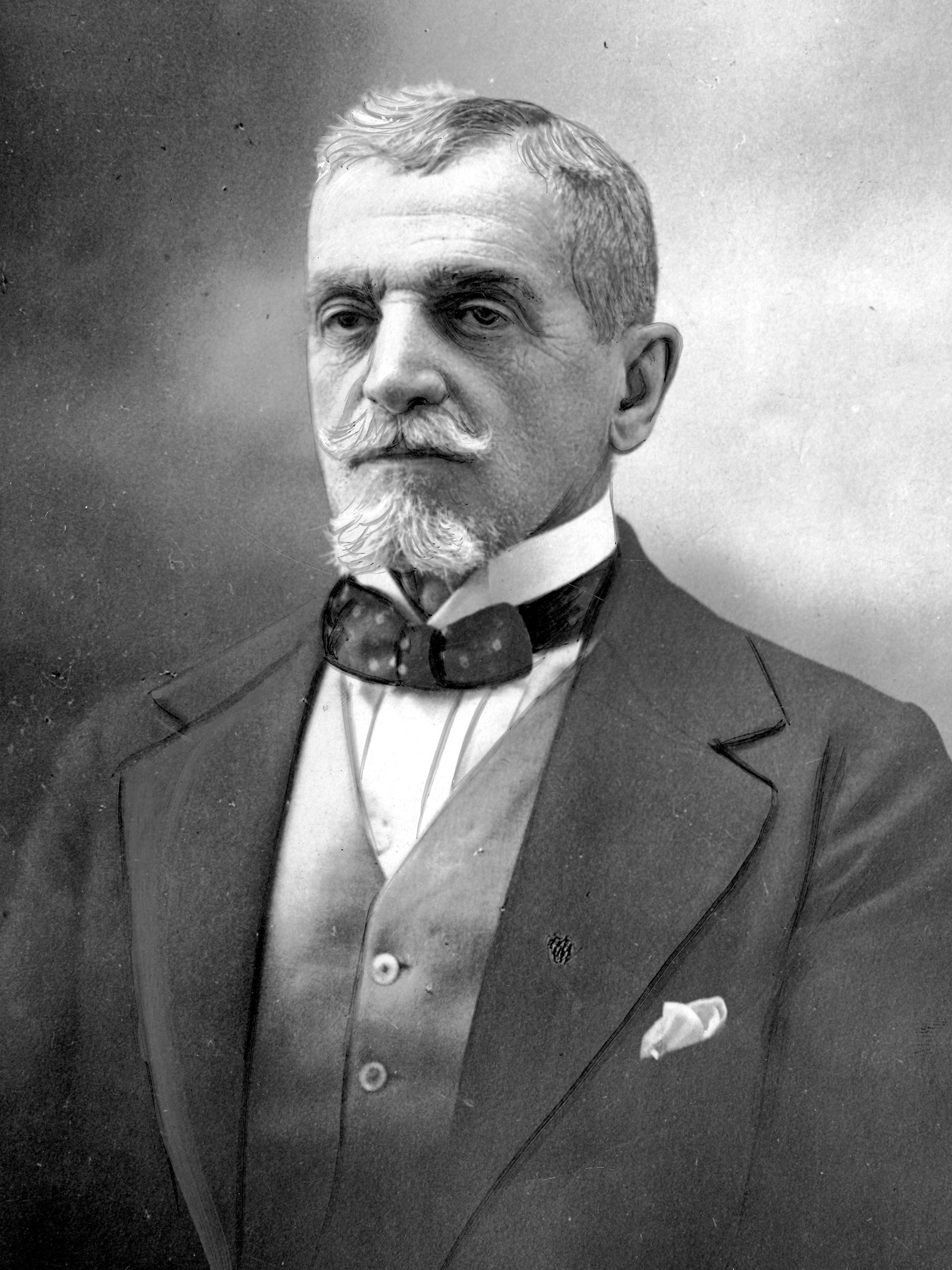
- Photograph of Kronenberg
- Born: 27 July 1849; Warsaw, Poland
- Died: 23 February 1937 (aged 87); Brzezie, Poland

Baron Leopold Julian Kronenberg (27 July 1849, in Warsaw – 23 February 1937, in Warsaw) was a Polish banker.

== Biography ==
Kronenberg was born the son of banker and railroad tycoon Leopold Stanisław Kronenberg (1812–1878) and his wife Ernestyną Rozalią Leo (1827–1893). Both parents came from Jewish families which had converted to Protestantism—the Kronenbergs, to Calvinism. Leopold Julian Kronenberg's five siblings were banker Stanisław Leopold, composer Władysław Edward, Tekla Julia, Marię Różę, and Różę Marię Karolinę.

After graduating from gymnasium, he studied law, then took up the study of agriculture at Bonn and Poppelsdorf. While his father was still active, Kronenberg managed the Saint Petersburg branch of the Warsaw Commercial Bank. In 1887, however, he was obliged to resign, on account of his brother's illness, in order to look after the management of the railway lines in which the latter was interested and of the Commercial Bank of Warsaw.

Kronenberg took an active interest in various useful public institutions. He was president of the Society for the Mutual Help of Musical Artists, a working member of the Polytechnical Committee in Warsaw, etc. In recognition of his distinguished services in connection with great commercial undertakings, he was made a hereditary baron of the Russian empire in 1893.

Valuable musical compositions by Kronenberg have been published under the pseudonym "Wiejesky".

Married to famous soprano Józefina Reszke (1855–1891), he had two children: Baron Leopold Jan Kronenberg (1891–1971) and Baroness Józefina Róża Kronenberg (1889–1969) the last of her family. Shortly before his death, Leopold Kronenberg converted to Catholicism so that he could be buried next to his wife in the family vault at Warsaw's Powązki Cemetery.

== See also ==
- List of Poles
