= BRE Bank =

Former Polish bank

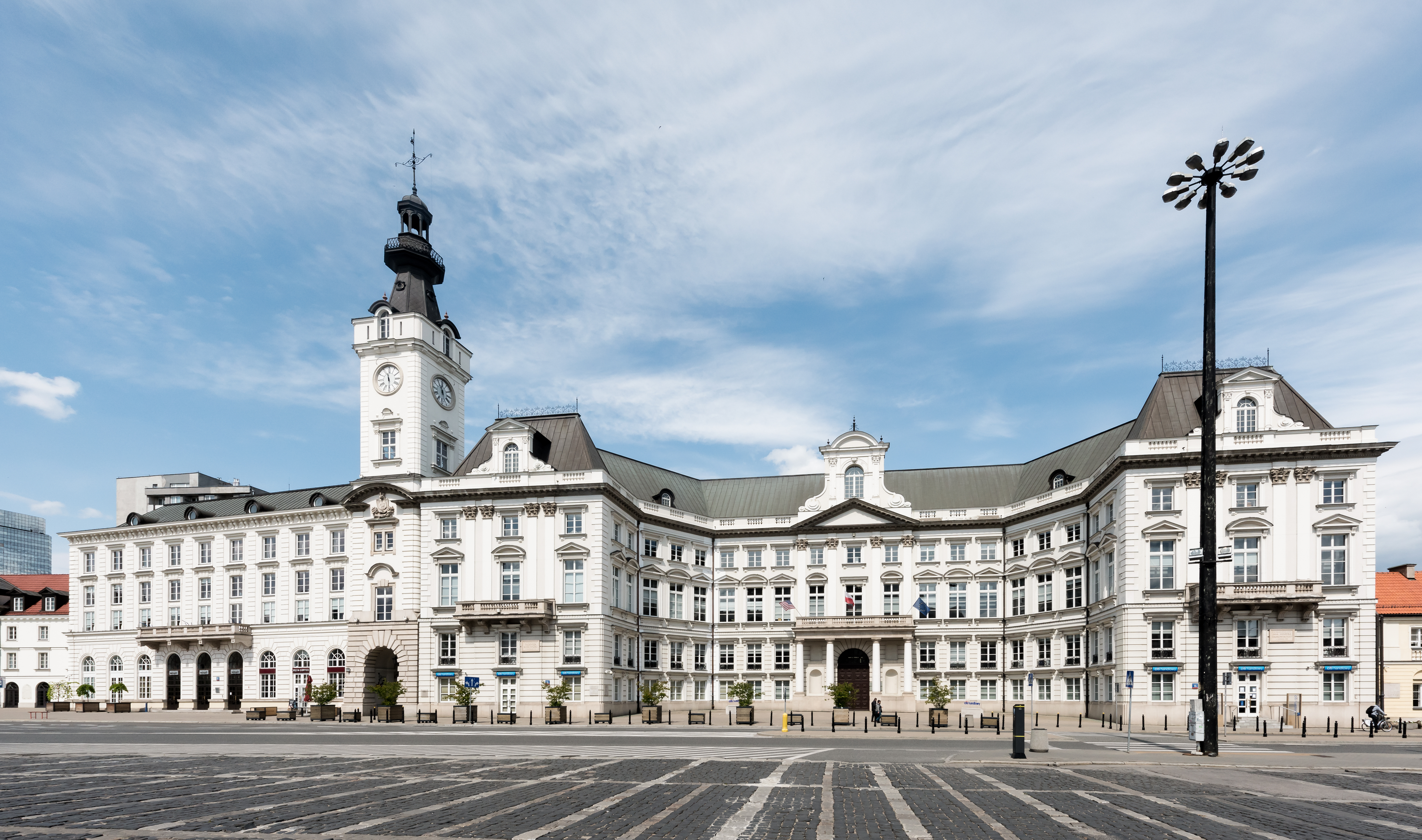
BRE Bank was headquartered together with Bank Handlowy in Warsaw's Jabłonowski Palace, whose reconstruction it co-financed

BRE Bank, for Bank Rozwoju Eksportu (lit. 'Export Development Bank'), was a bank based in Warsaw, Poland. It was established in 1986-1987, and took over Polski Bank Rozwoju (Bank PBR) in 1998. Frankfurt-based Commerzbank acquired it in stages, gaining majority control in 2003, and fully replaced the BRE brand with mBank in 2013.

== History ==
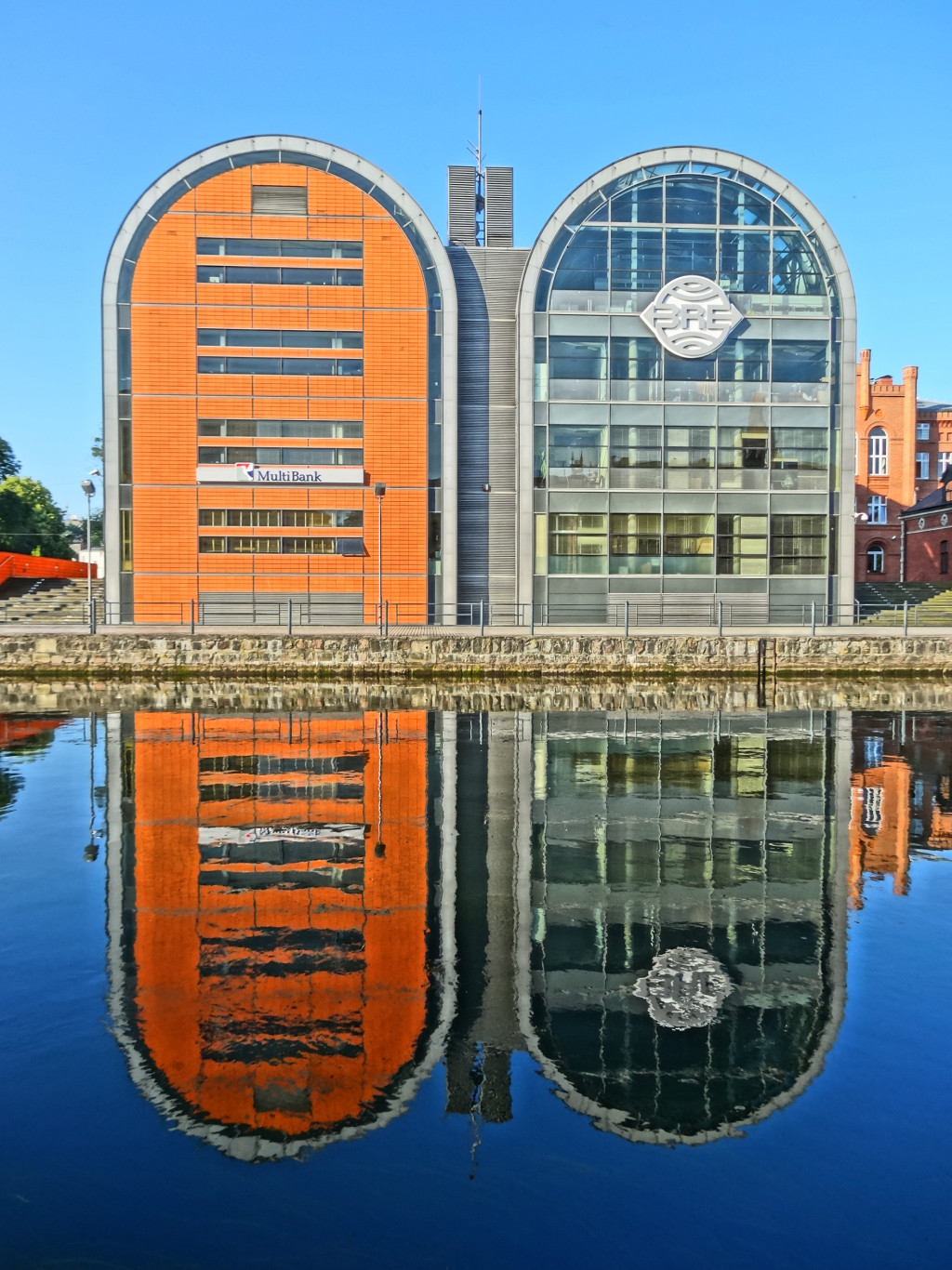
BRE Bank in Bydgoszcz, 2013

Bank Rozwoju Eksportu was established in 1986-1987 as a joint-stock company, to provide competition for the incumbent state-owned export credit banks Polska Kasa Opieki (PeKaO) and Bank Handlowy. Three years later, BRE Bank was granted credit lines from the World Bank and International Finance Corporation and became a member of SWIFT.

In 1990, BRE Bank was privatised through a public offering. The BRE Group set up its first subsidiaries: Biuro Maklerskie BRE Brokers (later mBank Dom Maklerski) and BRE Services (later mLeasing). In 1995, the bank launched its Private Banking, and in 1997 it set up Towarzystwo Funduszy Inwestycyjnych SKARBIEC, an investment fund company. In 1998, it absorbed Bank PBR, the Polish Development Bank that had been established in 1990 to provide preferential funding to commercial banks for economic policy purposes. In 1999, BRE established PTE Skarbiec-Emerytura, a pension fund. In 2000, BRE bank started operations in the retail banking segment, launching mBank, the first direct bank in Poland. In 2001 it launched its second retail arm, MultiBank.

In 1994, BRE signed an agreement on strategic partnership with Commerzbank. Commerzbank acquired a 50-percent stake in 2000, and cemented its majority control in 2003. In 2013, Commerzbank phased out the MultiBank and BRE Bank brands, and integrated all the bank's Polish operations under the single mBank brand.

== Leadership ==
The successive presidents of BRE Bank have been:

- 1986–1998: Krzysztof Szwarc
- 1998–2004: Wojciech Kostrzewa
- 2004–2008: Sławomir Lachowski
- 2008–2010: Mariusz Grendowicz
- 2010–2013: Cezary Stypułkowski

== See also ==
- List of banks in Poland
