= House of the Eagles =

Office building in Warsaw, Poland

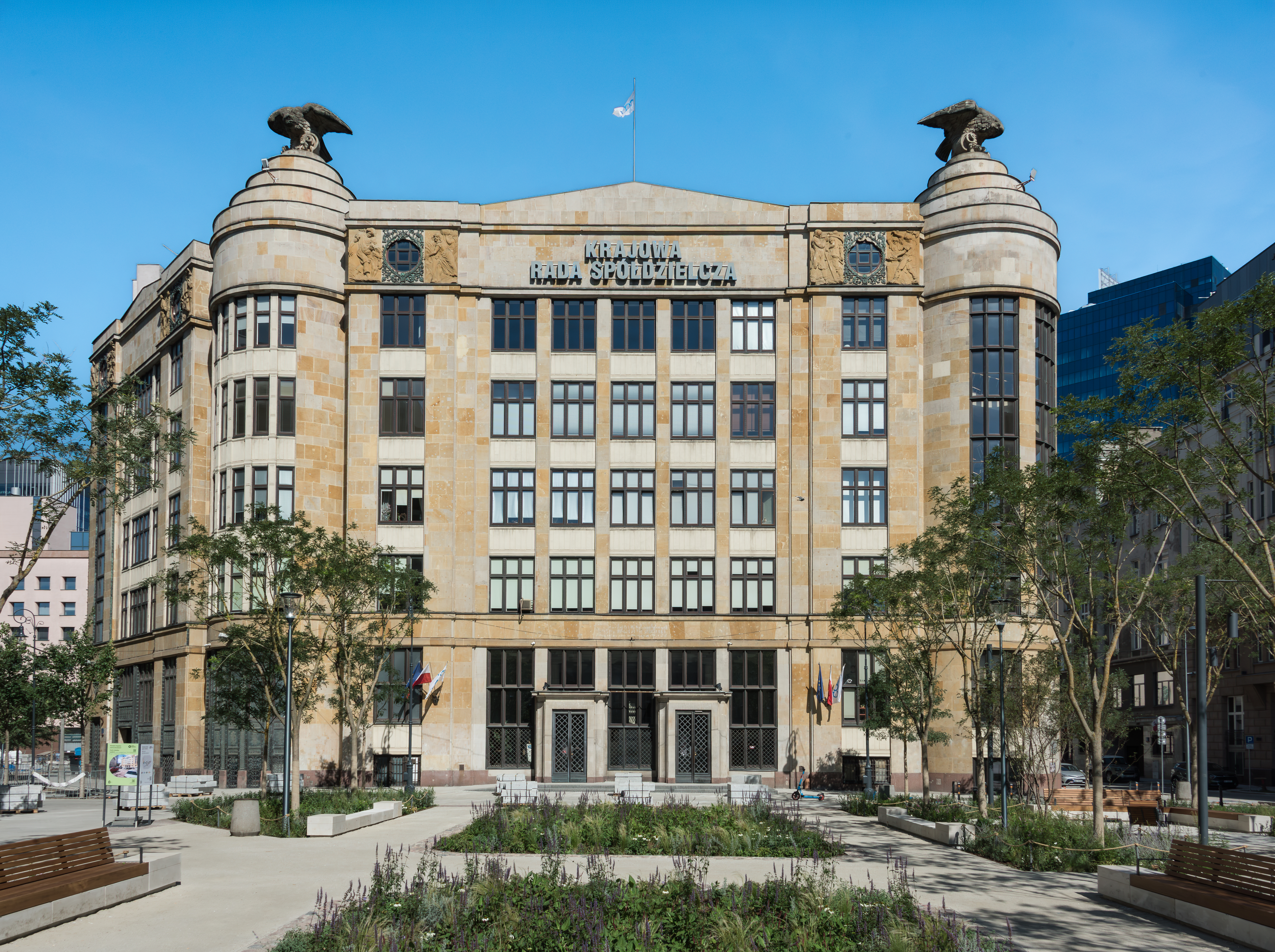
- The building in 2026.
- Interactive map of the House of the Eagles area

General information
- Type: Office building
- Architectural style: Modernist
- Location: 1 Jasna Street, Downtown, Warsaw, Poland
- Coordinates: 52°14′01″N 21°00′42″E
- Construction started: 1912
- Completed: 1917

Technical details
- Floor count: 6

Design and construction
- Architects: Jan Fryderyk Heurich; Barbara Brukalska (1948 reconstruction)

The House of the Eagles (Polish: Dom Pod Orłami), also known as the Cooperative Associations Bank Building (Polish: Budynek Banku Towarzystw Spółdzielczych), is a modernist office building in Warsaw, Poland, located at 1 Jasna Street, within the North Downtown neighbourhood. It houses the headquarters of the Cooperative State Council, the Museum of the Cooperative Movement History, and a branch of Bank Pekao. The building was designed by Jan Fryderyk Heurich, and built between 1912 and 1917. It was heavily damaged in 1944 during the Second World War, and was rebuilt and expanded between 1948 and 1950. It is registered on the voivodeship heritage list.

== History ==
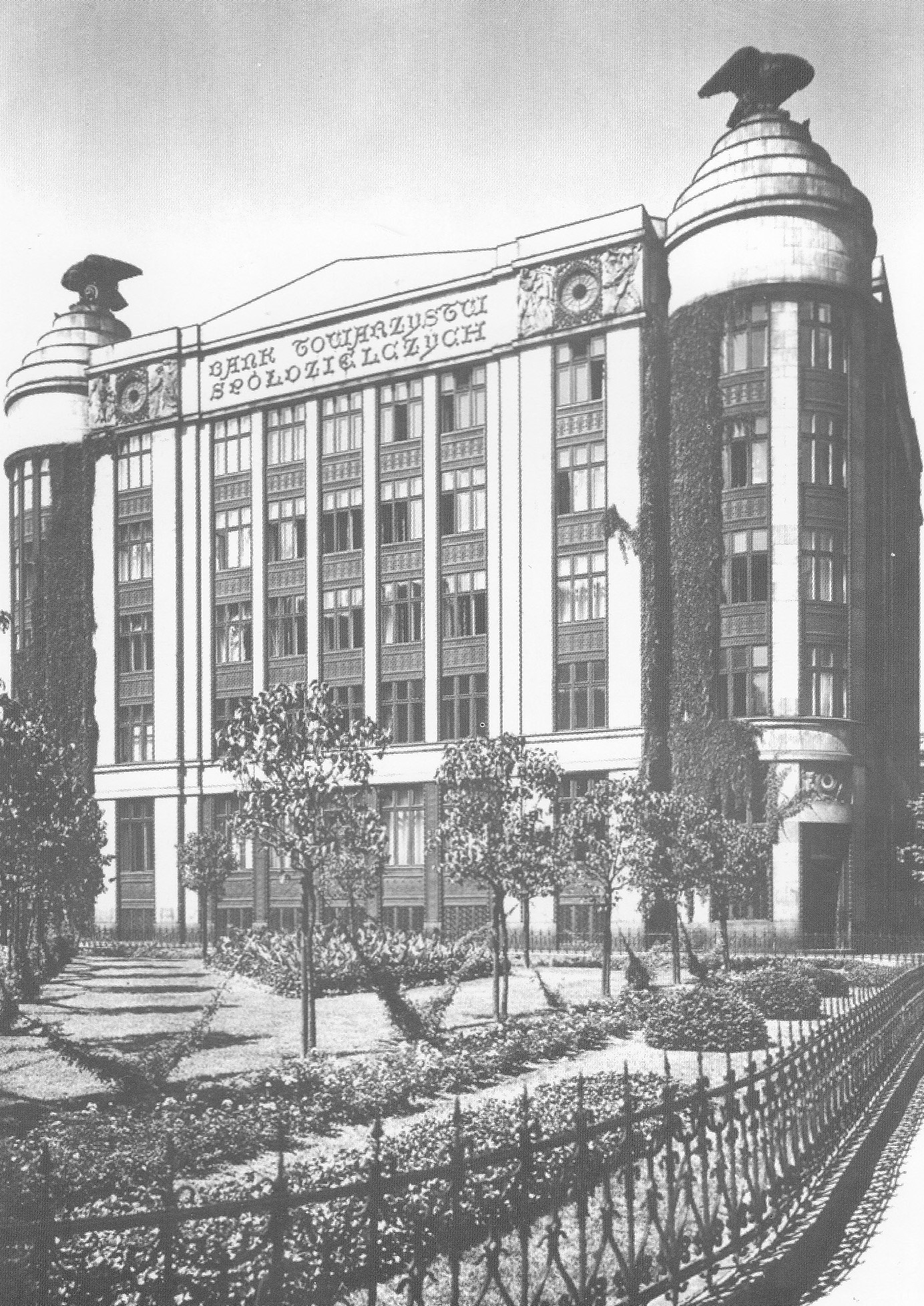
The House of the Eagles in 1937.

The building was designed in the modernist style by Jan Fryderyk Heurich. It was built between 1912 and 1917 in place of a morgue and cemetery chapel of the Child Jesus Hospital. The building became the headquarters of the Cooperative Associations Bank, which operated until 1946.

Its façade was decorated with copper metal sheets decorated with plant motives. Its walls also featured reliefs by Jan Antoni Biernack, titled the Farm Work, and at the top of front corners were installed large sculptures of eagles, made by Józef Zygmunt Otto.

The House of the Eagles was heavily damaged in 1944, during the Warsaw Uprising. Additionally, a provisional cemetery for the fallen insurgents was organized at a small square in front of the building. It was rebuilt between 1948 and 1950, and expanded towards Sienkiewicz Street, with the project designed by Barbara Brukalska. The building became the provisional headquarters of the National Bank of Poland, and later one of its branches.

On 22 December 1964, a motorized convoy transporting money from the Central Department Store, was attacked and robbed in front of the building, killing two guards, and stealing 1.3 million Polish zloties. It was one of the largest heists in the history of Poland.

Currently, the building is the headquarters of the Cooperative State Council, the Museum of the Cooperative Movement History, and a branch of Bank Pekao.

== Architecture ==
The House of the Eagles is a 6-storey-tall modernist office building, currently housing the headquarters of the Cooperative State Council, the Museum of the Cooperative Movement History, and a branch of Bank Pekao. Its walls also feature reliefs by Jan Antoni Biernack, titled the Farm Work, and its front corners are topped off with two sculptures of eagles, made by Józef Zygmunt Otto. Its façade is also decorated with copper metal sheets decorated with plant motives.

== Gallery ==
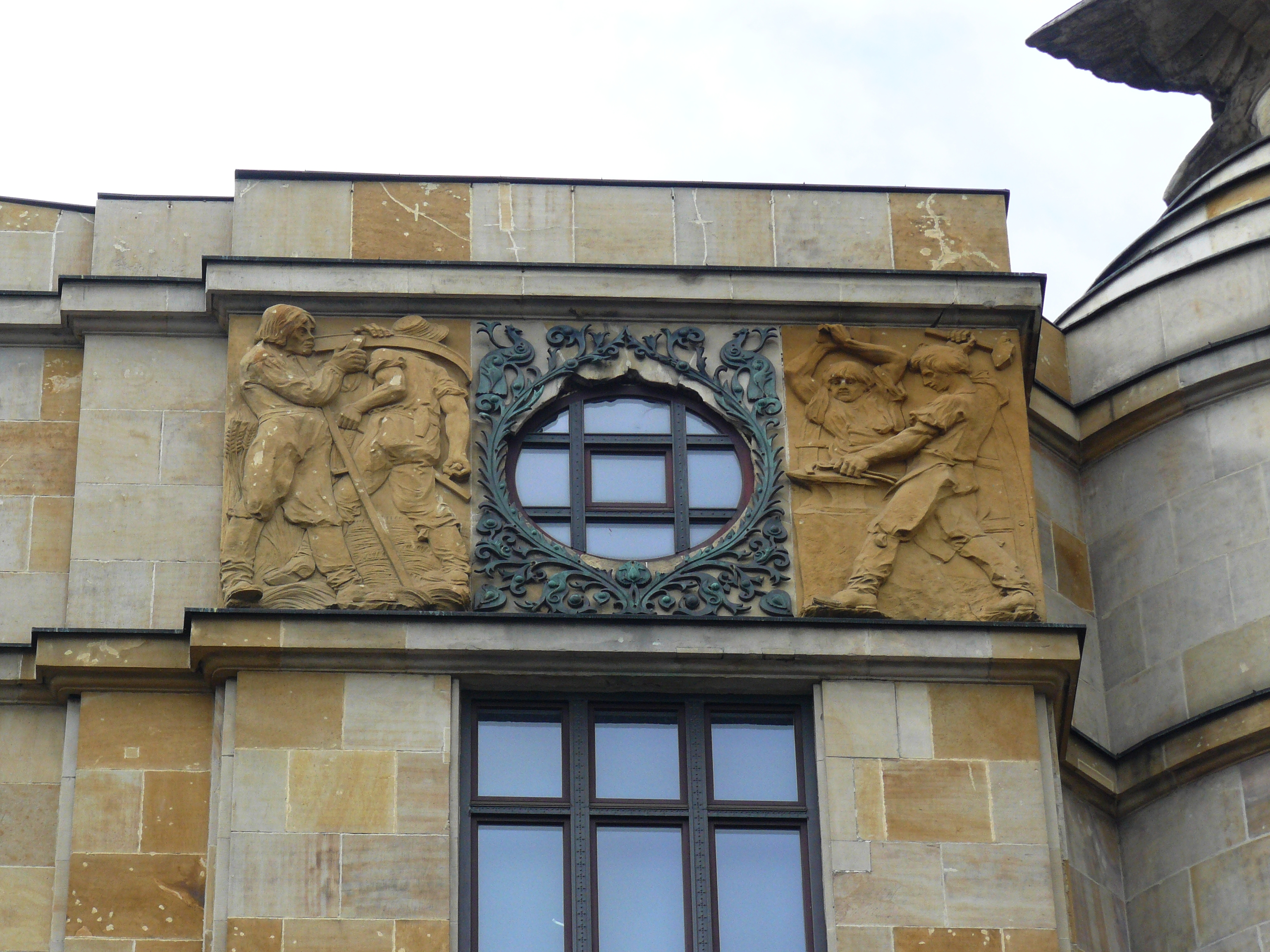
Of one the reliefs by Jan Antoni Biernack.

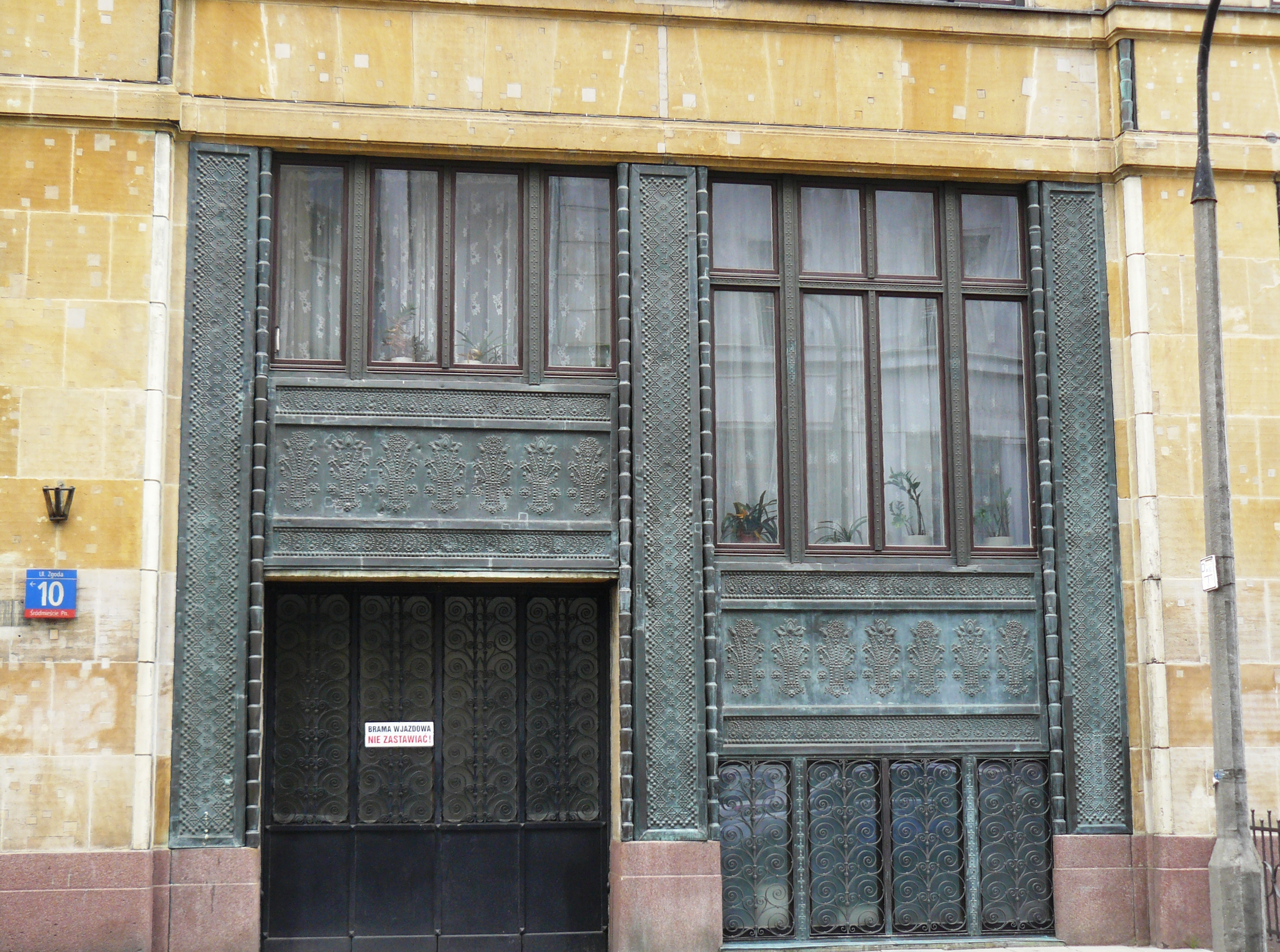
An entrance decorated with copper metal sheets with plant motives

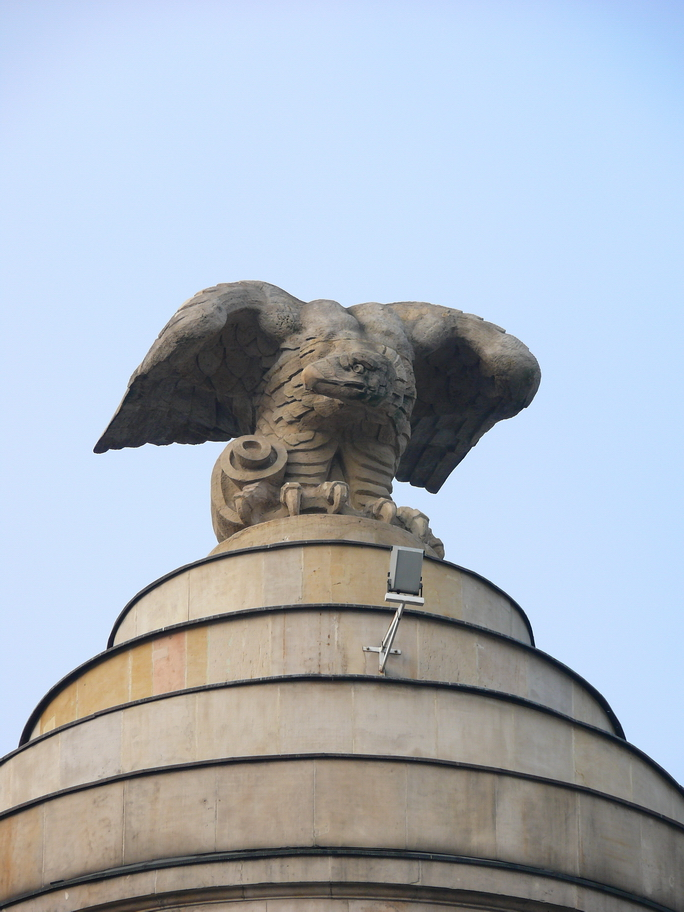
One of the sculptures of eagles by Józef Zygmunt Otto.

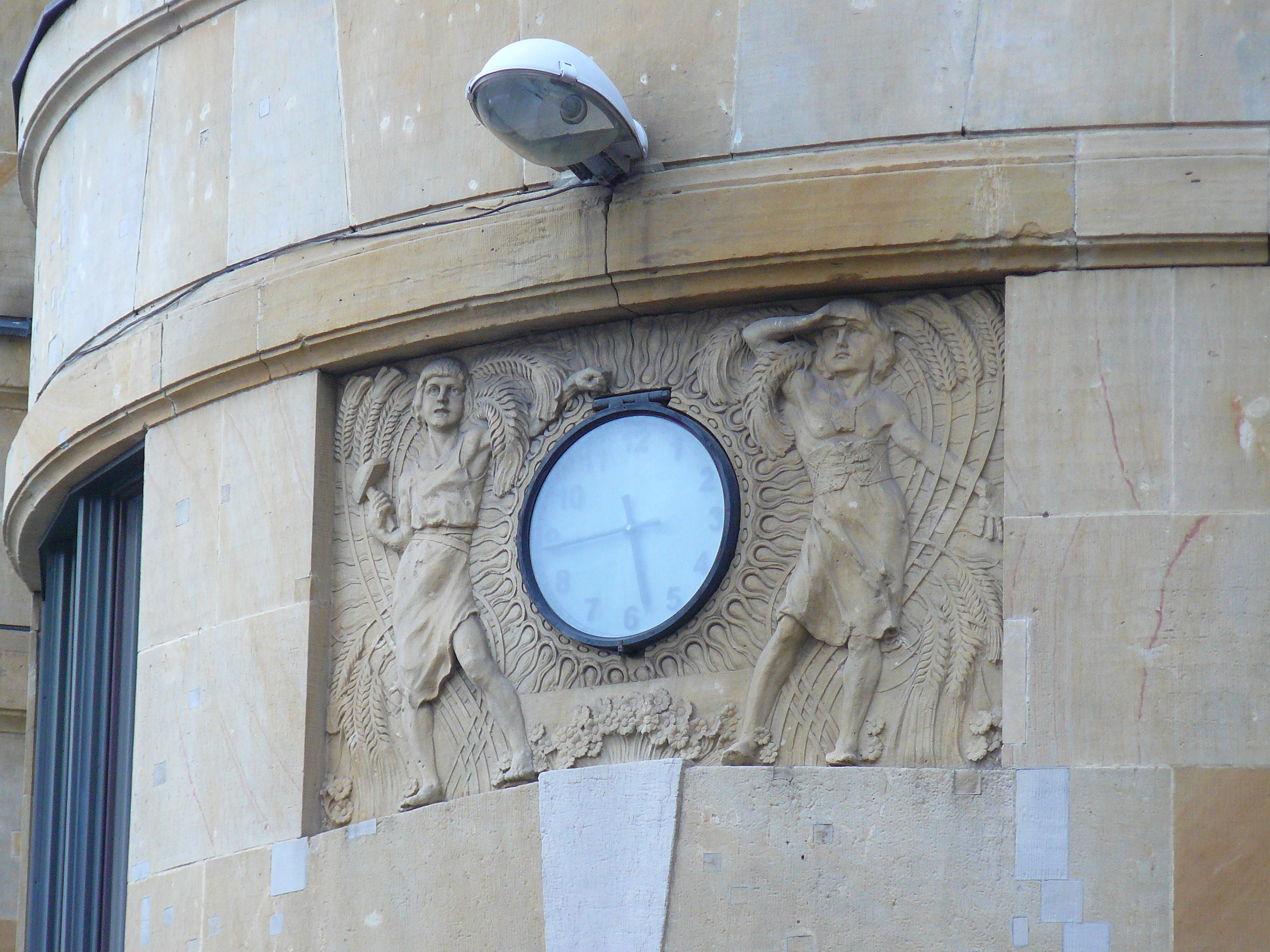
A relief with a built-in clock.
