= Pewex =

Chain of shops in Polish People's Republic

Internal Export Company
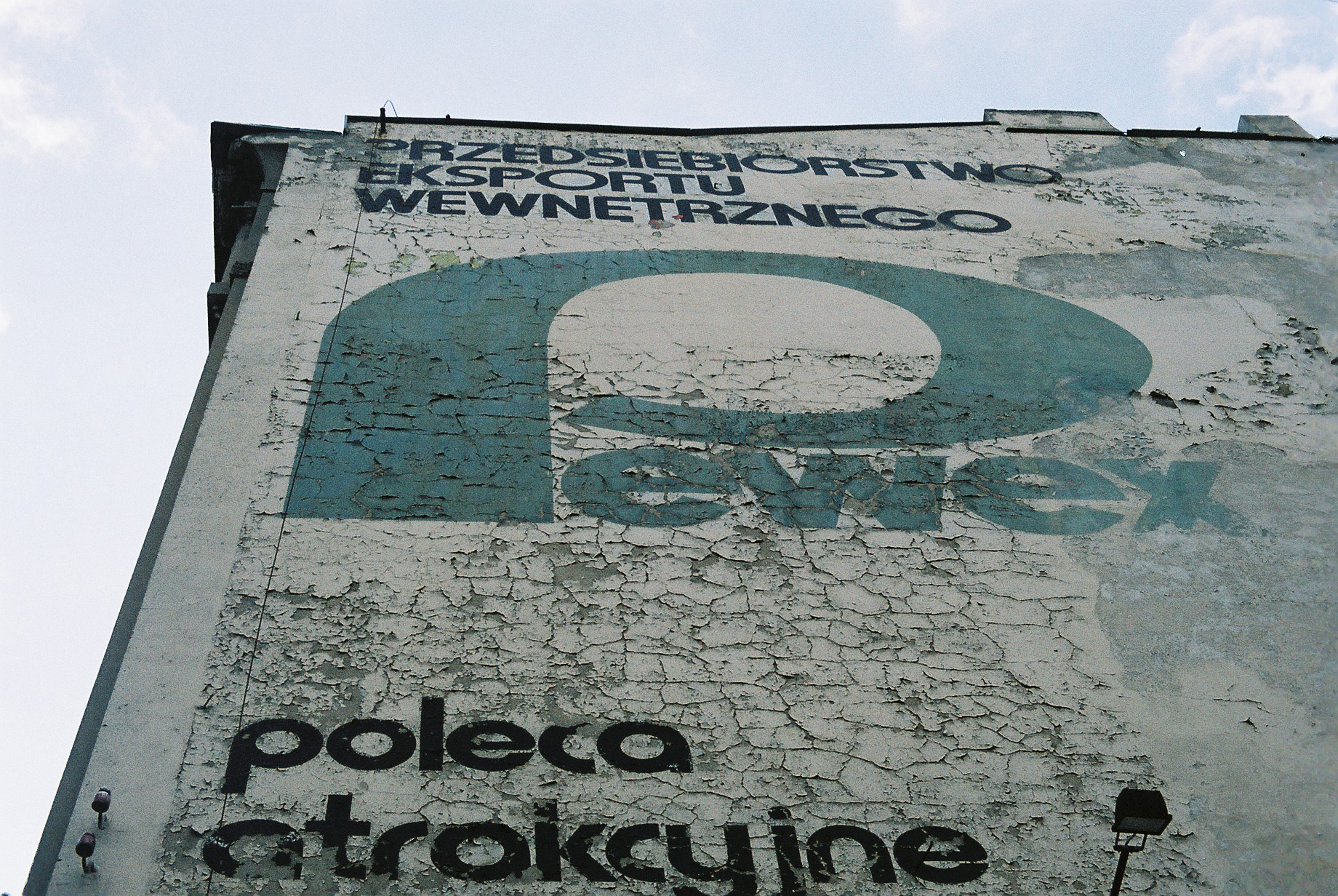
- A mural in Łódź depicting the company logo

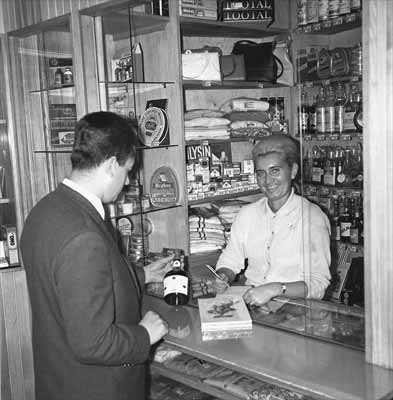
- A Pewex shop
- Native name: Przedsiębiorstwo Eksportu Wewnętrznego
- Type: State-owned enterprise
- Industry: General stores
- Founded: 1972
- Founder: Government of the Polish People's Republic
- Defunct: 2003
- Fate: Merged with Concorde Investissement
- Revenue: 20 billion złoty (roughly US$66 million) (1987)
- Owner: Pekao (1972–1991); Marian Zacharski (1991–?)

Pewex (Polish pronunciation: [ˈpɛvɛks]; short for Przedsiębiorstwo Eksportu Wewnętrznego, lit. 'Internal Export Company') was a chain of hard-currency shops founded in 1972, during the Communist era in Poland that accepted payment only in the United States dollar and other hard currencies, instead of the country's indigenous currency, the złoty.

== History ==
Pewex was created in the 1970s to help combat Communist Poland's foreign currency deficit.

By the late-1960s, it had become apparent that the then socialist centrally-planned economy of Poland was inefficient. The rule of Edward Gierek led to a short period of economic prosperity. With the aid of foreign loans, Gierek instituted a programme to modernise industry and increase the availability of consumer goods. The standard of living increased markedly and for a time he was hailed a miracle-worker. The economy, however, began to falter during the 1973 oil crisis and by 1976 price increases became necessary, mostly to ease the repayment of these loans.

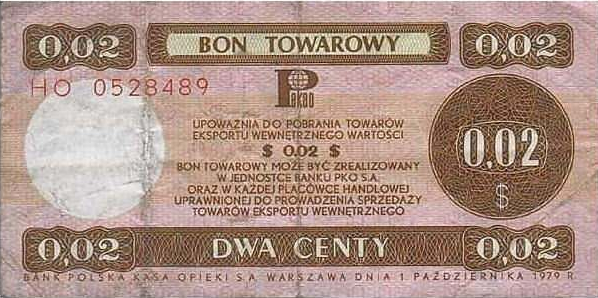
Pekao checks were used in Pewex shops. This is an example of a US$0.02 note.

To obtain much needed foreign hard currency from Polish society, authorities permitted in 1972 the creation of a network of shops under a state-owned bank named Pekao. There, foreign hard currency could be exchanged for both foreign and domestic goods, many of which were unavailable to Poles at that time. Since ownership of hard currency as cash was forbidden and all dollars and Deutschmarks had to be deposited to dollar bank accounts, authorities introduced Bon PeKaO cheques, which were tied to the U.S. dollar at a 1:1 ratio and could be used as currency in Pekao shops. Later on the Pekao bank created a separate company, Przedsiębiorstwo Eksportu Wewnętrznego – the Pewex.

During the Communist era, Poles were allowed to own dollars, something that was not allowed in other Eastern Bloc states. Many Poles at the time also received remittance from friends and family members in the United States. The US dollars received by Poles could either be used for foreign travel or used at the Pewex shops. Products for which Poles would otherwise have to wait a long time or settle for their poor imitations could be had immediately by buying them at a Pewex shop.

Pewex offered a large number of imported items not available for purchase on the normal market. Items were purchased outside of the rationing system then in place, and customers did not have to queue up for items. Items sold include liquor, cigarettes, household appliances, candy, cars, computers and furniture.

Shopping at Pewex at the time was seen as a rather exclusive affair, due to the high cost of its items when compared to the average salary at the time. This turned Pewex into a symbol of luxury and privilege.

At the end of 1989, Pewex had a network of 840 shops in Poland. In 1987, Pewex was noted in a report issued by the United States Joint Publications Research Service to have had a sales volume of about 70 billion złoty, based on the then-official exchange rate to the US dollar of "nearly 300 zlotys to the dollar", with a revenue of 20 billion złoty.

=== Post-Communist government ===
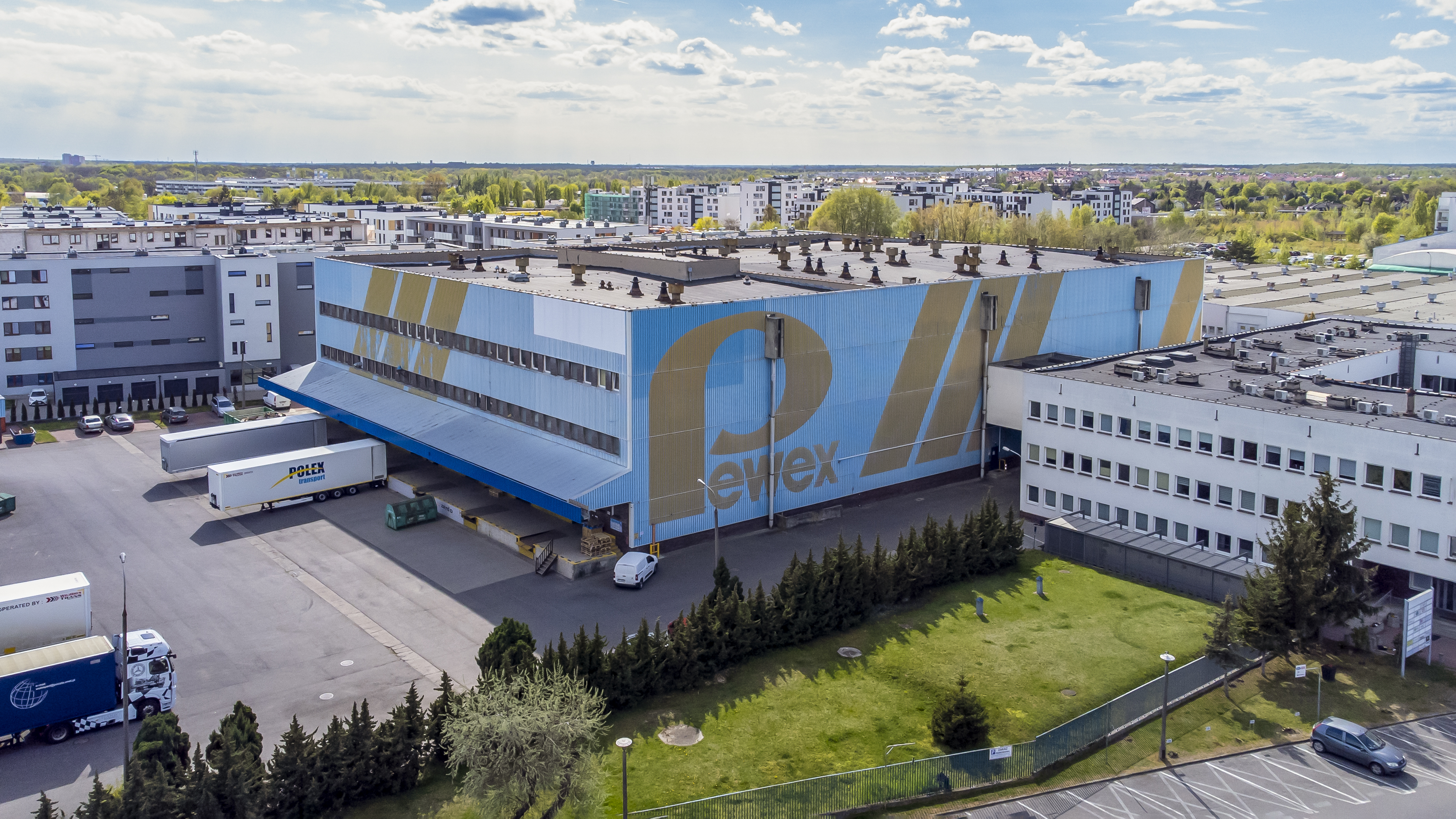
Former Pewex warehouse in Podolany, Poznań.

As part of the peaceful transition of the economic system in Poland after the 1989 revolution in Poland, the Polish economy was privatised and the ownership of foreign currency was deregulated. This made the Pekao cheques obsolete and soon afterwards most of the goods that had only been available from Pewex stores started to be sold in private shops as well.

In 1991, Marian Zacharski, a former Polish spy who was sentenced to life in prison by American authorities for stealing military secrets and was subsequently released in a spy exchange, became the chain's owner and CEO.

In 1993, Pewex filed for bankruptcy for the first time. However, this and subsequent bankruptcy filings were rejected. In December 1995, it was announced that a debt restructuring deal would see a bank named Polski Bank Rozwoju, along with two French companies, swap a debt worth 93.6 million zlotys at the time for a majority stake in 1996. In 1997, the approximately 150 stores still operating under the Pewex brand were taken over by Concorde Investissement, and Pewex took over its immovable real estate portfolio as Towarzystwo Handlu i Nieruchomości Pewex S.A. (THiN Pewex). In 2003, THiN Pewex and Concorde Investissement merged, which resulted in the complete phase-out of the Pewex brand from the Polish market. In December 2013, the Pewex brand was re-activated as an online shop mostly selling novelty items operated by Monster Media Group, the owners of demotywatory.pl. The Pewex brand is also used by an otherwise unrelated chain of supermarkets in Italy.

== See also ==
- Baltona
- Shortage economy
- Eastern Bloc economies
- Beryozka (Russian retail store), a Soviet Union counterpart
- Intershop, an East German counterpart
- Tuzex, a Czechoslovak counterpart
