= NLY =

NLY or NLy may refer to:

- Annaly Capital Management (NYSE: NLY)
- Niki airline (ICAO code: NLY)
