= MBank =

Polish universal banking group

mBank SA

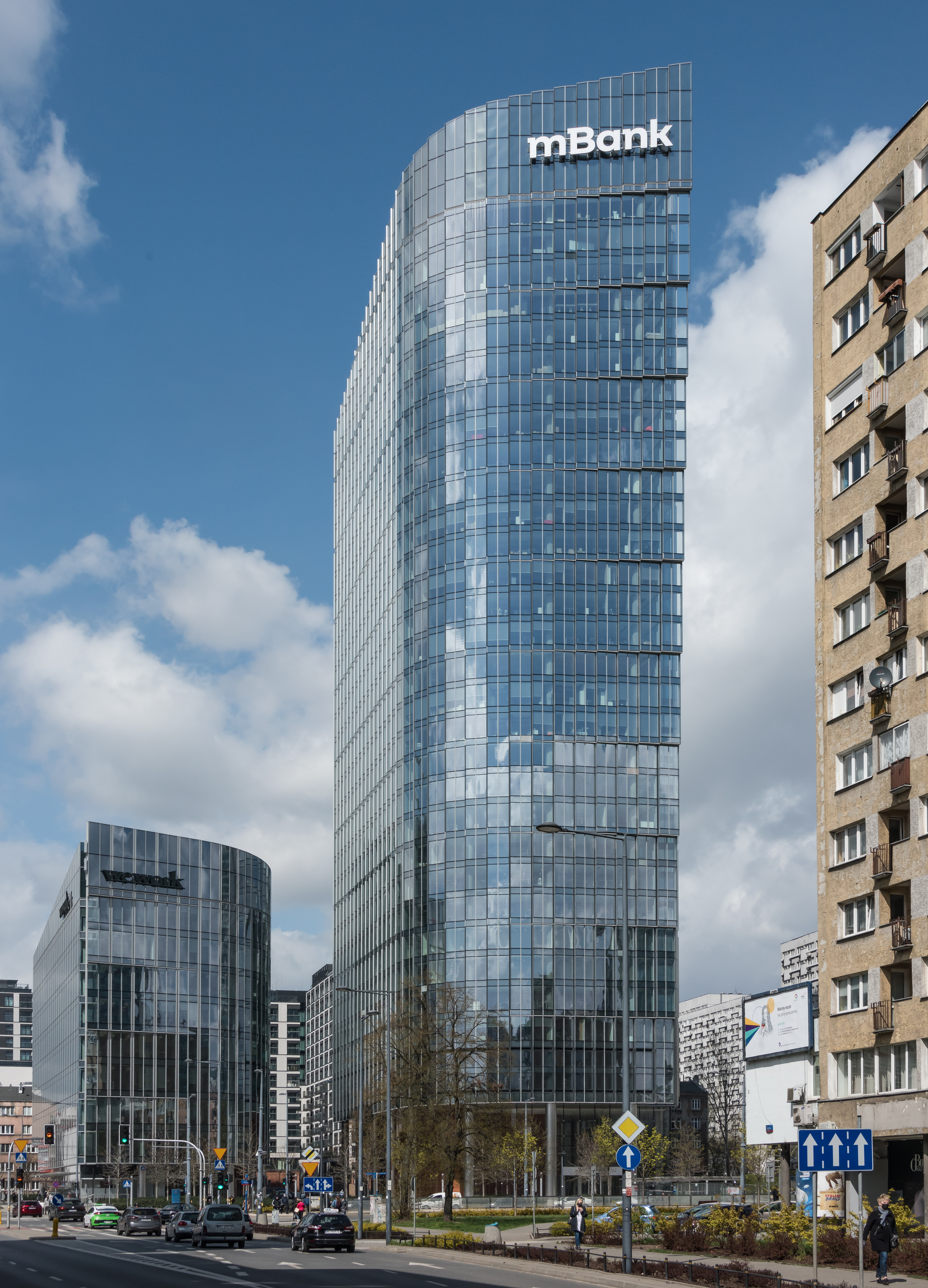
- mBank headquarters in Mennica Legacy Tower, in Warsaw
- Formerly: Bank Rozwoju Eksportu; BRE Bank
- Type: Public company
- Traded as: WSE: MBK; WIG30 component
- ISIN: PLBRE0000012
- Founded: 1986; 40 years ago
- Founder: Krzysztof Szwarc
- Headquarters: Mennica Legacy Tower, Warsaw, Poland
- Area served: Poland, Czech Republic, Slovakia
- Key people: Cezary Kocik, President of the Management Board
- Services: Banking; Financing
- Owner: Commerzbank (69%), NN Group (5%)
- Subsidiaries: mAccelerator, mBank Hipoteczny, mElements, mFaktoring, mFinanse, mInvestment Banking, mLeasing, LeaseLink, mServices
- Website: www.mbank.pl

mBank SA is a bank based in Warsaw, Poland. At the end of September 2016, it was Poland's fourth largest universal banking group in terms of total assets and loans, and fifth by deposits. It offers retail, corporate and investment banking as well as other financial services such as leasing, factoring, insurance, financing of commercial real property, brokerage operations, wealth management, corporate finance and advisory in the scope of capital markets. It is the successor of BRE Bank, following a rebranding in 2013.

mBank is listed on the Warsaw Stock Exchange. It also has a branch in the Czech Republic and a subsidiary in Slovakia, initiated by BRE Bank in 2007.

== History ==
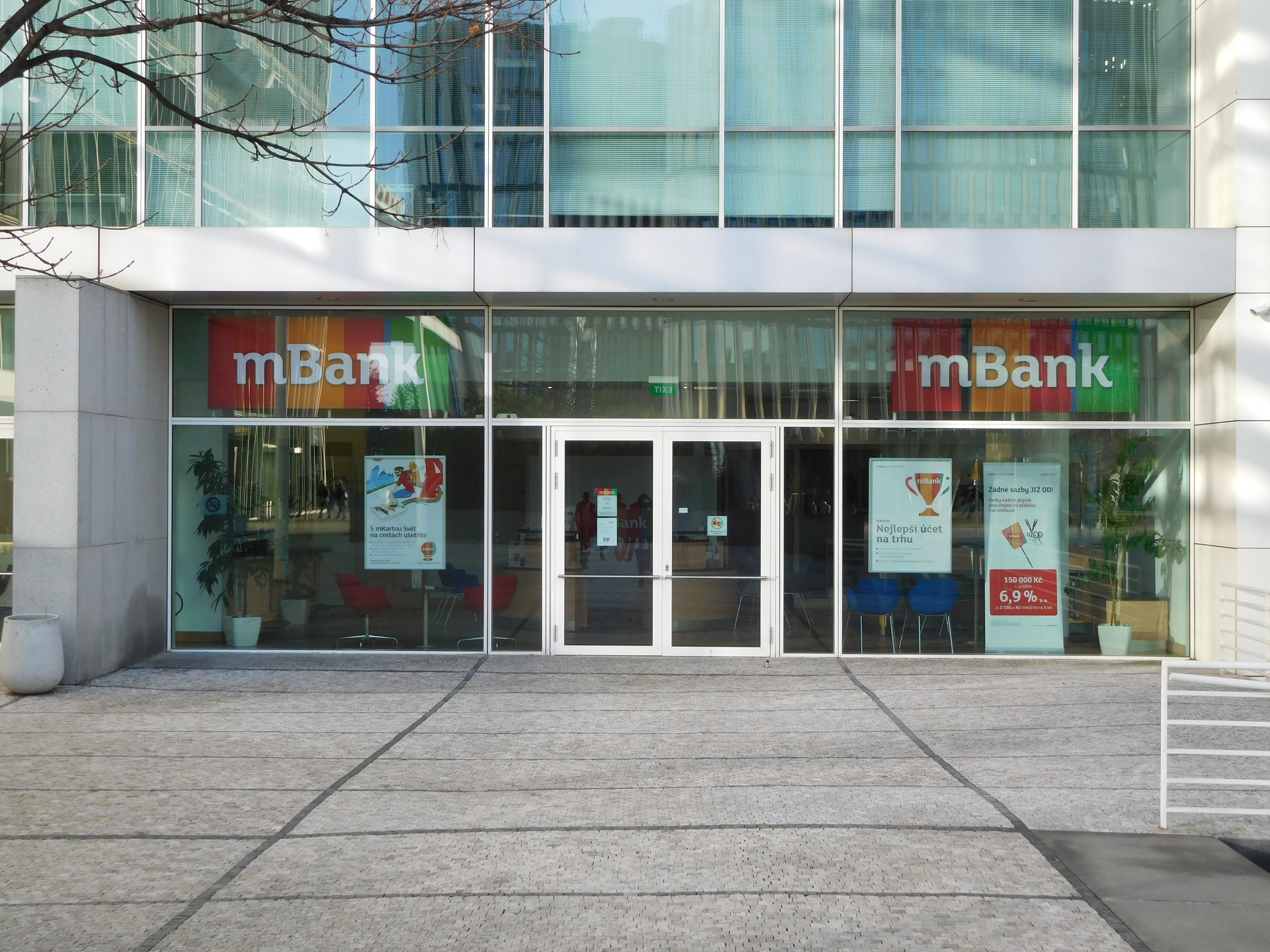
mBank in Prague, Czech Republic

The mBank brand was born in 2000 as the direct bank service of BRE Bank, of which Commerzbank acquired majority control in 2003. In 2001 BRE Bank launched its second retail arm, MultiBank. In 2013, MultiBank, BRE Bank and mBank were replaced by the single mBank brand.

In 2014, mBank launched Orange Finanse, a mobile retail bank. In 2015, mBank entered into long-term cooperation with AXA Group. In 2016 mBank's subsidiaries Dom Maklerski mBanku and mWealth Management become part of mBank. The bank sold its subsidiary mLocum to Archicom in 2017.

In September 2019 mBank's parent company Commerzbank announced they wanted to sell their 69.3 percent stake in the bank. In early 2020, Commerzbank then abandoned their plans, as they were not able to sell under favorable conditions due to the COVID-19 pandemic.

Cezary Stypułkowski led mBank until 2024, when he was succeeded by Cezary Kocik.

== Operations ==
mBank Group is composed of:

- mLeasing, one of Poland's leading leasing companies
- mBank Hipoteczny, Poland's largest mortgage bank
- mFaktoring, an invoice factoring business
- mCentrum Operacji, a subsidiary providing back office services to other subsidiaries of mBank Group
- mCorporate Finance, a subsidiary specialising in investment banking services
- mFinanse (formerly Aspiro), a subsidiary providing financial advisory services
- mFinance France
- mElements, a subsidiary specialising in e-commerce and API banking

== Controversial foreign loans involvement ==
mBank is one of the top three Polish banks that have been granting foreign currency mortgage loans. Between 2002 and 2014 mBank granted more than 70,000 such loans. A great majority of them are Swiss Franc linked. As a consequence of the 2008 financial crisis, Swiss Franc has significantly strengthened to Polish zloty. In case of some loans granted by mBank in 2008, their value increased twofolds.

mBank marketed Swiss Franc linked loans as much cheaper to their local equivalents. Indeed, the LIBOR rate was lower than the Polish WIBOR rate. However, when adjusted for foreign exchange effect, the cost of these loans, and especially the amount of the debt, become excessive.

mBank did not inform its clients about the full extent of the risk connected with these loans. mBank management claims it itself did not assess the risk correctly.

mBank received about 7 billion CHF in short-term loans from its parent company Commerzbank to finance its foreign currency mortgage loans. Initially – in 2006 and 2007 – the loans from Commerzbank were granted with a very low interest margin of 0.15%. However, the margin was increased to approximately 2.0% when they had to be renewed. Since many of the early loans granted by mBank to its customers had a margin of around 1.0%, these loans have become margin negative (i.e. unprofitable) for mBank.

For a number of years mBank was able to manage this loan unprofitability by charging debtors installment fees, so-called "spreads". These spreads were used by mBank to compensate low interest rates. However, in July 2011, the Polish banking law was amended to eliminate such additional payments.

In addition, clauses regulating linkage between Swiss Franc and Polish Zloty in the loan agreements used by mBank were found unfair and included in the unfair clauses register maintained by the Office of Competition and Consumer Protection.

Since the European Council Directive 93/13/EEC of 5 April 1993, contract terms found to be unfair should not bind consumers, the linkage between Swiss Franc and Polish Zloty present in mBank agreements was undermined.

However, mBank has not recognized the validity of this regulation. Therefore, a number of legal proceedings ensued, including a class action lawsuit started by 1,247 debtors.

One of the side effects of the raising exchange rate is growth in the loan-to-value ratio of the foreign loans. Until 2008, the average LTV ratio for mBank's foreign mortgage loans was in the 60s. Later it increased to over 80% and currently stands at 82.2%. Loans with LTV over 80% are deemed more risky, especially when the changes in LTV are not related to the property value but uncontrolled by both bank and debtor factor, such as foreign exchange rate.

As of the end of 2015, mBank held the equivalent of around 5 billion CHF of Swiss Franc linked loans and had 3 billion CHF obligations to Commerzbank.

It was announced in July 2019 that Commerzbank was being investigated by the European Central Bank and BaFin for facilitating its subsidiary mBank's toxic financial product offering in Poland, as well as for the linked potential tax evasion resulting from Commerzbank's financing of mBank's CHF-linked toxic financial products.

== See also ==
- List of banks in Poland
