= Marian Zacharski =

Polish intelligence officer

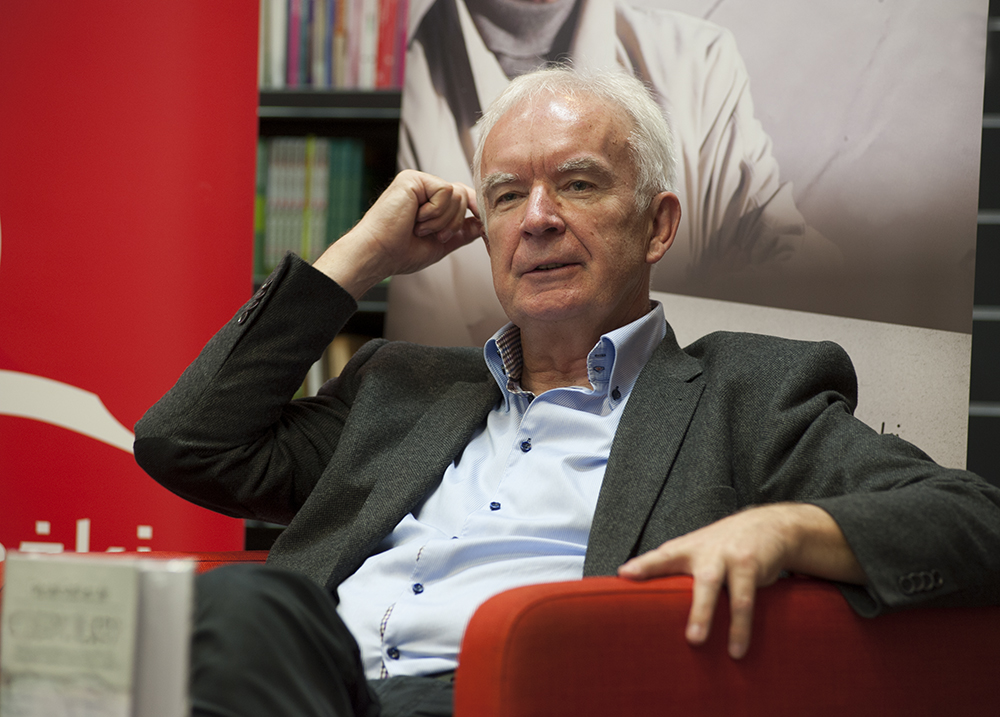
- Zacharski in 2015
- Born: 15 August 1951 (age 75); Gdynia
- Military career
- Allegiance: Polish People's Republic; Poland
- Service years: 1975–1996
- Rank: Generał brygady (Brigadier general
- Units: 1st Department of the Ministry of Internal Affairs; Office of State Protection
- Commands: Head of the Intelligence Directorate
- Awards

Marian Zacharski (born 1951 in Gdynia, Poland; raised in nearby Sopot), is a former Polish intelligence officer, arrested in 1981 and convicted of espionage against the United States. After four years in prison, he was exchanged for American agents on Berlin's famous Glienicke Bridge. Arguably, he was one of the most famous officers of the Polish intelligence service. In 1996, prosecutors in Warsaw charged him with flagrant mismanagement at the Pewex company, and Gorzów Wielkopolski police want to question him about illegal car trading.

== Espionage ==
Zacharski was president of the Polish American Machinery Corporation (POLAMCO) and lived in the United States from about 1977 until 1981. Acting as the commercial representative, he was at the same time an officer of the Polish intelligence service. In June 1981 William Holden Bell, project manager of the Radar Systems Group at Hughes Aircraft in El Segundo, California, and Zacharski, were arraigned on espionage charges. For the apprehension of Marian Zacharski credit belongs to a Polish diplomat Jerzy Koryciński at the United Nations who blew the whistle, while asking for political asylum in the US.

Under disguise of business activities, and over the period of several months, Zacharski developed a relationship with Bell. According to a court affidavit filed by the bureau, he had paid Bell about $110,000 in cash and $60,000 in gold coins, to photograph highly classified documents detailing Hughes Aircraft radar and weapons systems. Furthermore, Zacharski won access to material on the AIM-54 Phoenix (beyond visual range air to air missile), an enhanced version of the Hawk SAM, and its successor, the MIM-104 Patriot, as well as radar instrumentation for the F-15 fighter, F-16, "stealth radar" for the B-1 and the F-117 stealth 'fighter', an experimental radar system being tested by the U.S. Navy, submarine sonar, and the M1 Abrams tank.

According to Kenneth Kaiser, an agency counterintelligence supervisor in Chicago, Poland was particularly active in industrial espionage: "While the Soviet KGB got all the press, Polish intelligence was perhaps superior. They, however, could not care less about military intelligence; they wanted economic and scientific secrets. Their objective was to short-circuit development costs and undersell us and, as the Zacharski case suggests, they were good at finding friends in the right places."

Zacharski disclosed the activities of a Russian spy in Poland who under code name "Olin" (known as affair of Olin - Polish Security Services and Oleksy Case Olingate) cooperated with one of the best connected KGB agents and the most powerful Russian spies Vladimir Alganov and another Russian diplomat, Georgiy Yakimishin. This consequently resulted in the fall of Polish government under Prime Minister Jozef Oleksy.

In June 1996 Marian Zacharski left Poland for Switzerland and is currently living in Kreuzlingen. Currently Wojciech Bockenheim from the Polish TV station TVN produced six TV movies entitled Szpieg ("Spy") "in search of Marian Zacharski", which is dedicated to disclosing some of the activities of Zacharski.

== Discovery ==
According to current official statements and interviews he was discovered only because of a so-called Farewell list. Sometimes it is called Farewell Dossier, in fact this was a list of agents sold or transferred for ideological reasons (probably both) by KGB Lieutenant Vladimir Vetrov. By doing this and catching all from the list in one pack (in most cases without other evidence), the KGB had a clear trace that the source of the leak was Vetrov, and because French or other Western hemisphere countries did not even try to help him, Vetrov was sentenced to death and executed.

== Popularity in Poland ==
On 15 August 1994, the Polish government announced Zacharski's appointment as head of civilian intelligence in the Polish Office of State Protection, but the United States and Jan Nowak-Jeziorański protested and Zacharski never assumed the position. In a poll from that time that asked "Which colonel better served Poland?", Zacharski or Ryszard Kukliński, who spied for the United States, 52% responded "neither", 17% said Zacharski, and 7% responded Kukliński. In addition, 22% said Zacharski was fit to head Polish intelligence, and 22% disagreed.

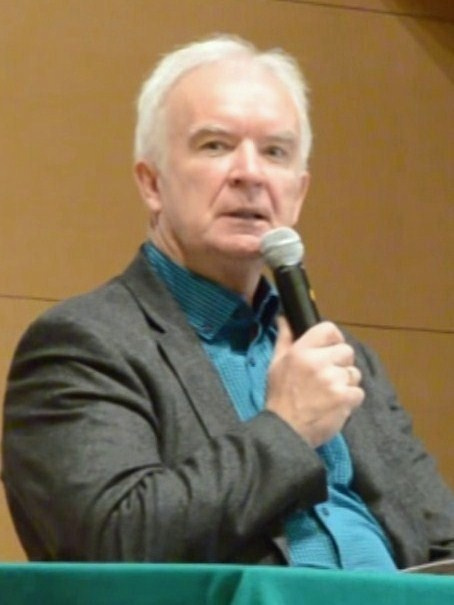
Zacharski in 2015 in Częstochowa

== Awards and decorations ==
- Officer's Cross of the Order of Polonia Restituta (1985)
- Bronze Cross of Merit
