= Leszek Skiba =

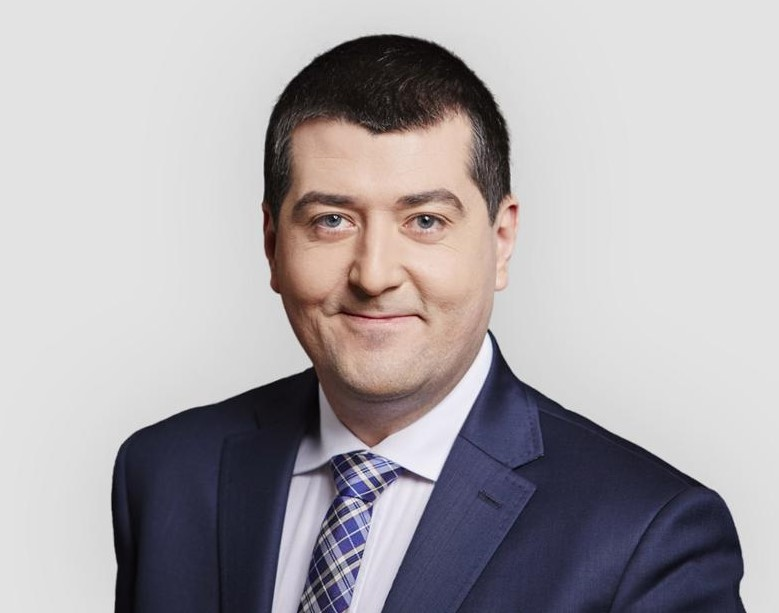
- Skiba's official Ministry of Finance portrait from 2019
- Born: June 20, 1978 (age 47); Lublin, Poland
- Education: Warsaw School of Economics
- Occupations: Banker and politician
- Known for: President of the Management Board of Bank Pekao

Leszek Skiba (born June 20, 1978) is a Polish banker and politician who was vice minister of public finance from 2015 to 2020 and President of the Management Board of Bank Pekao, the second largest bank in Poland, from 2020 to May 2024.

== Early life and education ==
Leszek Skiba was born in Lublin and graduated from the Warsaw School of Economics (SGH) with a master's degree in International Economic Relations in 2002.

== Career ==
After graduating in 2002 Skiba worked as an assistant at the Faculty of Political Studies at the National Louis University in Nowy Sącz.

Between 2009 and 2015 he worked at the National Bank of Poland, where he analyzed the effects of Poland's membership in the euro area. Afterwards he was appointed as an Undersecretary of State in the Ministry of Finance, supervising macroeconomic policies and tax legislation. He also supported legislative works related to financial and capital markets and helped preparing an outline for a budget system reform.

From 2019 to 2020 he was also president of the council of the Polish Bank Guarantee Fund.

In April 2020 he became Vice President of the Management Board of Bank Pekao and then President of the Management Board of Bank Pekao. While he already was managing the board in the role of vice president, he only became president of the board after gaining the approval of the Polish Financial Supervision Authority in February 2021. In May 2024, Skiba and five other members of the management board resigned from their positions at Bank Pekao. He also wrote several publications relating to his professional work and public activities.

== Private life ==
Outside of his career, Skiba is collecting historical atlases from various European countries. He also is married and has two children.
