= Annaly Capital Management =

American real estate investment firm

Annaly Capital Management, Inc.

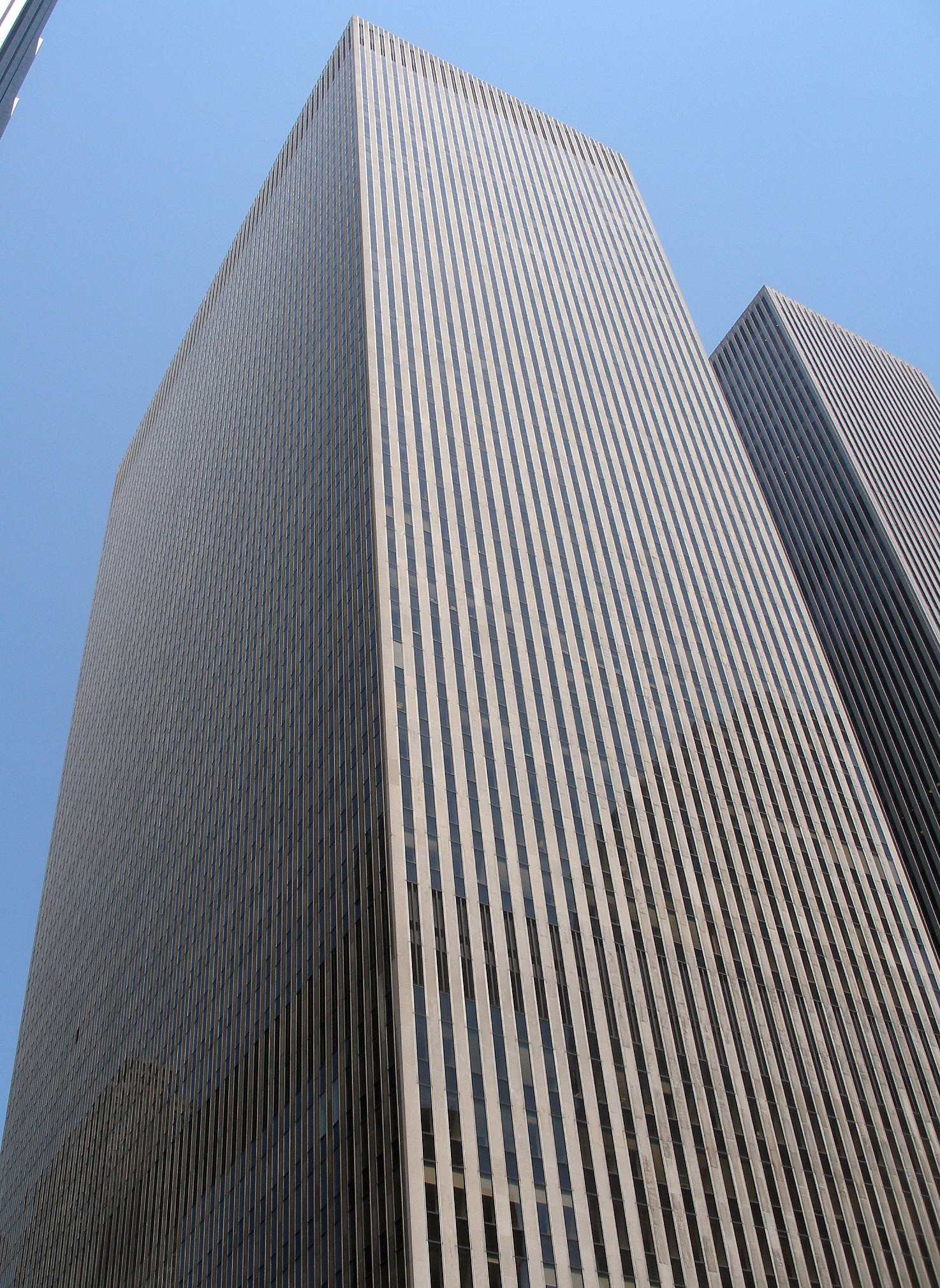
- 1211 Avenue of the Americas in Midtown Manhattan serves as the company headquarter
- Type: Public company
- Traded as: NYSE: NLY; S&P 400 component
- Industry: Real estate investment trust
- Founded: February 18, 1997; 29 years ago
- Founders: Michael A.J. Farrell; Wellington Denahan
- Headquarters: 1211 Avenue of the Americas; New York City, U.S.
- Key people: David L. Finkelstein (CEO & CIO); Serena Wolfe (CFO)
- Operating income: 1,771,991,000 United States dollar (2022)
- Net income: ▲US$2.027 billion (2025)
- Total assets: ▲US$135.610 billion (2025)
- Total equity: ▲US$16.159 billion (2025)
- Number of employees: 212 (December 31, 2025)
- Website: www.annaly.com

Annaly Capital Management, Inc. is one of the largest mortgage real estate investment trusts. It is organized in Maryland with its principal office in New York City.

The company borrows money, primarily via short term repurchase agreements, and reinvests the proceeds in asset-backed securities. As of December 31, 2023, 88% of the company's assets were mortgage-backed securities issued by either Fannie Mae or Freddie Mac. The company generates profits from the net interest spread between the interest earned from its assets and its borrowing costs, which is amplified from the use of leverage. As of December 31, 2019, the company had a GAAP leverage ratio of 6.8:1.

As of December 31, 2023, the weighted average days to maturity of its repurchase agreements was 44 days.

The company is ranked 857th on the Fortune 1000.

The company is named after Annaly, Ireland, which was ruled by the ancestors of the company's founder.

== History ==
Annaly Capital Management was founded in 1997 by Michael A.J. Farrell (1951-2012) and Wellington Denahan. Mike Farrell spent 26 years working for investment banks including E.F. Hutton & Co., Morgan Stanley, and Merrill Lynch.

In 2004, the company acquired Fixed Income Discount Advisory, an investment adviser, for $40.5 million in stock.

In October 2012, co-founder Wellington Denahan became CEO after Michael Farrell was diagnosed with cancer; Farrell died that month.

In 2013, the company acquired CreXus Investment for $996 million.

Effective September 30, 2015, Kevin Keyes was named CEO of the company.

In 2016, the company acquired Hatteras Financial for $1.5 billion in cash and stock.

In 2017, the company sold its Pingora servicing subsidiary.

In March 2020, David L. Finkelstein was named Chief Executive Officer and a member of the Board.
