= Pekao Tower =

Skyscraper in Warsaw, Poland

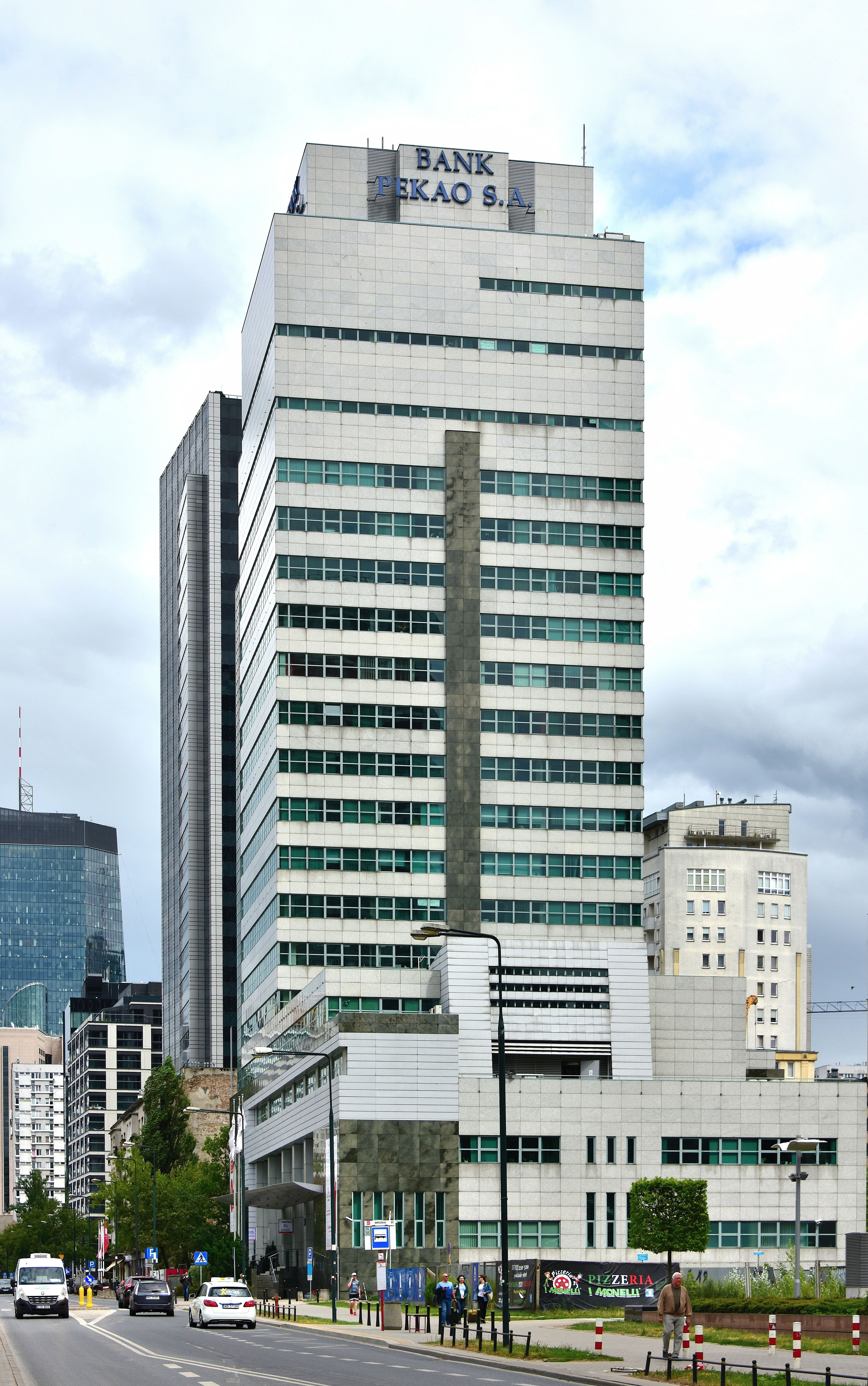
- Pekao Tower in 2018.
- Interactive map of the Pekao Tower area

General information
- Type: Office building
- Location: Warsaw, Poland, 53/57 Grzybowska Street
- Coordinates: 52°14′02″N 20°59′19″E
- Construction started: 1991
- Completed: 1993

Height
- Architectural: 80 m
- Tip: 85 m

Technical details
- Floor count: 20
- Floor area: 21,400 m²

Design and construction
- Architect: Miljenko Dumenčić
- Architecture firm: Ilbau Polska
- Developer: Bank Pekao

The Pekao Tower is a skyscraper office building in Warsaw, Poland, located at 53 and 57 Grzybowska Street within the district of Wola. It was opened in 1993 and, until 2023, housed the headquarters of the Bank Pekao.

== History ==
The building was commissioned by the Bank Pekao. It was designed by Miljenko Dumenčić from the Ilbau Polska architectural firm, and constructed between 1991 and 1993. Until 2023, it housed the headquarters of Bank Pekao. Reports in 2025 speculated that the new owner of the tower planned to demolish it.

== Characteristics ==
Its architectural height is 80 m, and its total height is 85 m. The building is 20 stories tall and has a total floor area of 21,400 m^{2}.
