= Bank Polska Kasa Opieki =

Polish bank

Bank Pekao S.A.

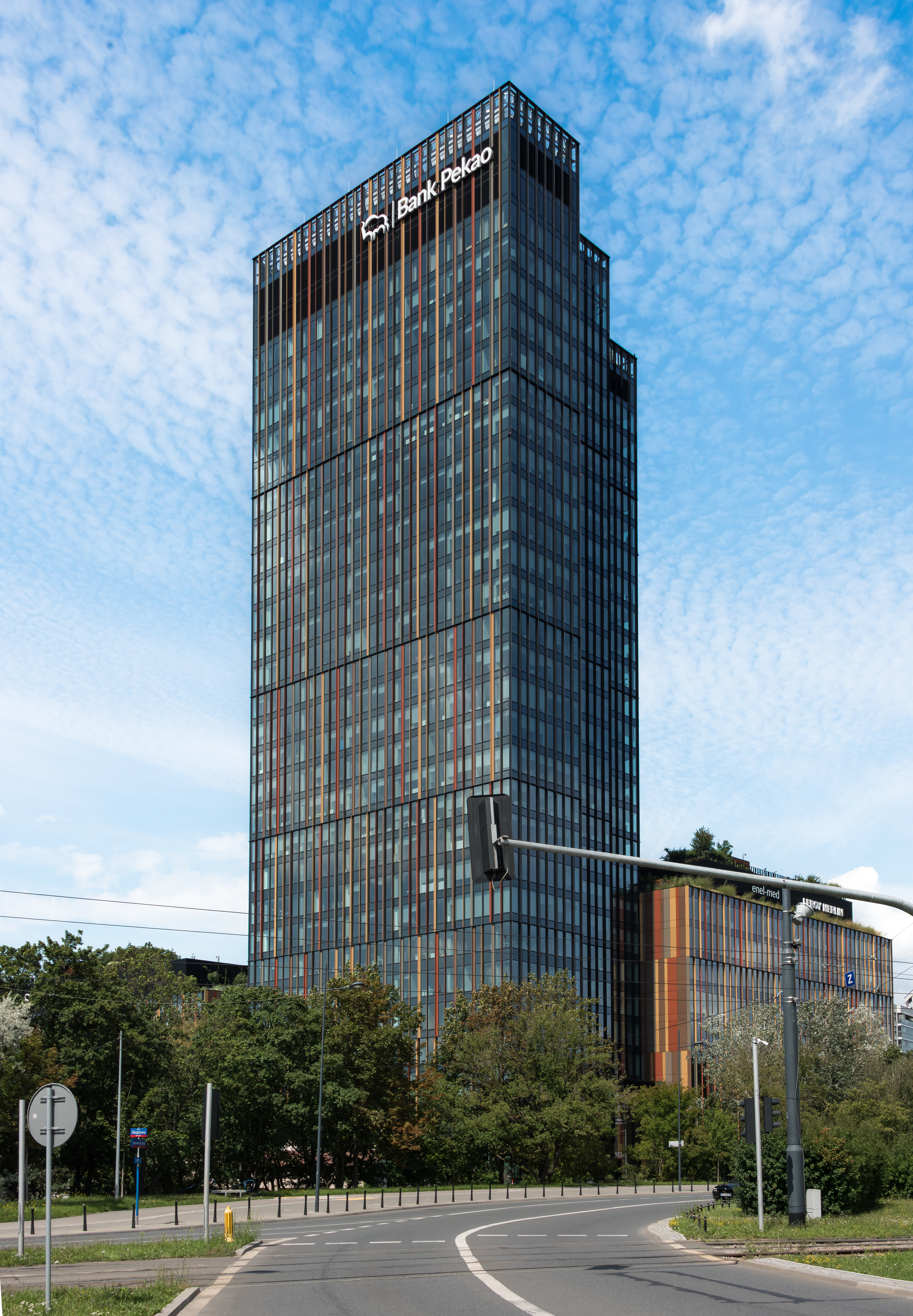
- Bank Pekao headquarters on Żubra Street, Warsaw
- Type: Joint-stock company (spółka akcyjna)
- Traded as: WSE: PEO; WIG30 component
- ISIN: PLPEKAO00016
- Industry: Finance and Insurance
- Founded: 17 March 1929; 97 years ago
- Founder: Ministry of Treasury
- Headquarters: Warsaw, Poland
- Key people: Cezary Stypułkowski, President of the Management Board
- Products: Financial services
- Revenue: $5.77 billion (2025)
- Net income: $1.6 billion (2025)
- Total assets: $80.92 billion (2025)
- Number of employees: 13,497 (2021)
- Website: www.pekao.com.pl

Bank Polska Kasa Opieki – Spółka Akcyjna, commonly using the shorter name Bank Pekao S.A., is a universal bank and currently the second largest bank in Poland with its headquarters in Warsaw. The Italian bank UniCredit used to own 59% of the company. It sold the bank in December 2016. Now Powszechny Zakład Ubezpieczeń owns 20% of the company, Polish Development Fund 12.80%, UniCredit 6.28%, and others 60.94%.

The bank was founded in 1929 by the Ministry of Treasury as a national bank, mainly to provide financial services to Poles living abroad. In 1939 the bank had branches in virtually every capital city of countries where Poles lived.

The full name "Polska Kasa Opieki" may be translated literally as "Polish Bank of Aid", and the popular form "Pekao" sounds out the acronym "PKO".

== History ==
=== Formative years ===
In 1929, the President of the Management Board of Pocztowa Kasa Oszczędności, Henryk Gruber, observed that there was a demand for a bank that could provide financial services to the eight million Poles living outside the country. Starting from these assumptions, on 17 March 1929, the Ministry of Finance established Bank Polska Kasa Opieki Spółka Akcyjna. On 29 October of the same year, the Warsaw District Court entered Bank Polska Kasa Opieki SA in the commercial register. The company's shareholders were Pocztowa Kasa Oszczędności, Bank Gospodarstwa Krajowego and Państwowy Bank Rolny. The first branches were opened in France, Argentina, and the United States, and in Tel Aviv (now Israel). By 1939 Pekao had branches in the capitals of most countries where Polish emigres had settled.

=== People's Republic of Poland ===
After the end of World War II and the beginning of the Soviet domination in Poland, the bank took care of international financial operations conducted by the authorities of the newly established Polish People's Republic. With the bank's help, the Poles who live abroad could support their families behind the Iron Curtain. In 1968, the Minister of Finance authorized the establishment of foreign currency accounts for individuals working abroad in Bank Pekao. Pekao lost only in 1989 with the onset of economic reforms that swept into Poland and the communist bloc.

In the 1970s, currency accounts in Pekao were divided into three categories: Account A for people paying currencies with documented origin, B accounts for payments with undocumented origin, and C accounts for foreigners. The funds from B accounts could not be legally exported abroad, but in 1976 the rights of A and B accounts were leveled. In 1974, the bank had around 91,000 registered accounts. At the end of the 1980s, the total value of foreign currency accounts was US$3.3 billion.

Much earlier, in 1960, the bank began issuing its own vouchers, "Bon Towarowy PeKaO", denominated in US dollars. Initially, for these vouchers (as well as directly for convertible currencies deposited in domestic and foreign bank representations), it was possible to buy both foreign and deficit domestic goods in the foreign sales network operated directly by Bank Pekao. The offer of the bank for individual clients included a variety of goods covering, among others, groceries (including "Krakus" ham and Western chewing gum), alcohol, cosmetics, textiles, household appliances, bicycles, motorcycles, cars, trucks, tractors, agricultural machinery, fuel, building materials, installation and sanitary equipment, and also apartments and furniture. This retail network was created with the establishment of the Pewex "internal export" company in 1972 out of the bank's structures.

=== Third Polish Republic (1989–present) ===
Logo of Pekao UniCredit

In 1996, a government decision brought together Polska Kasa Opieki with Bank BDK in Lublin, Bank PBKS in Szczecin, and the larger Bank PBG in Łódź, three regional banks that had been spun off in 1988-1989 from the National Bank of Poland. On 1 January 1999, the four banks were merged into Bank Polska Kasa Opieki SA, or Bank Pekao. On 3 August 1999, Bank Pekao was privatized and became a member of the UniCredit Group.

In December 2016, Polish state-owned PZU, together with the Polish Development Fund, acquired Bank Pekao – Poland's second-largest bank, previously owned by Italian bank UniCredit—by buying a 32.8% stake in the bank for the amount of PLN 10.6 billion (EUR 2.6 billion).

In September 2018 Bank Pekao opened a representative office in London with the aim to facilitate cooperation between Poland and the UK and to stay close to their clients and investors. Bank Pekao also plans on opening several other offices across Europe.

At the end of 2020, Bank Pekao announced its acquisition of Idea Bank, which was subjected to compulsory restructuring to prevent bankruptcy. The acquisition was facilitated by Poland's Bank Guarantee Fund (BGF), an institution aiming to maintain stability in the financial system and resolve issues with financially distressed institutions.

Since 2022, the headquarters of the bank has been located in the Forest Tower in Warsaw, Poland. Their previous office, the Pekao Tower on Grzybowska Street, was put up for sale in 2023.

In 2022 Bank Pekao's profits declined by 48.8% due to two main factors. The first reason was the introduction of payment holidays by the Polish government, which allowed mortgage holders to postpone payment installments, which in turn led to a cost of 2.4 billion zlotys ($498.4 million) for the bank. The second reason was the increased provisions for legal risks, as Bank Pekao expected a higher number of court cases related to the long-running Swiss franc mortgage affair. After initially predicting a decrease in interest margins for 2023 due to higher deposit costs and the potential of the Polish central bank reducing interest rates, for the first quarter of 2023 the net interest income grew by 34% to 2.77 billion zlotys ($651.1 million), while the net profit surged by 60% to 1.45 billion zlotys ($349.7 million).

In early 2023, Bank Pekao, alongside three other banks, signed a cooperation agreement with Orlen Synthos Green Energy (OSGE). The agreement aims to provide financing for the construction of several BWRX-300 small modular reactors (SMs) in the country. According to Bank Pekao's president, Leszek Skiba, the investment was made because nuclear energy production aligns with Bank Pekao's aspirations to be a leader in Poland's energy transformation.

In June 2025, Bank Pekao and Polish insurer PZU agreed on a potential merger plan in order to create a €23 billion financial firm.

== List of directors ==
List of Bank Pekao Presidents of the Management Board:

- Marian Kanton (1989–1996)
- Andrzej Dorosz (1996–1998)
- Maria Pasło-Wiśniewska (1998–2003)
- Jan Krzysztof Bielecki (2003–2010)
- Alicja Kornasiewicz (2010–2011)
- Luigi Lovaglio (2011–2017)
- Michał Krupiński (2017–2019)
- Marek Lusztyn (2019–2020)
- Leszek Skiba (2020–2024)
- Cezary Stypułkowski (2024–)

== Pekao Group ==
Apart from Pekao Bank, Pekao Group's subsidiaries are:

- Centralny Dom Maklerski Pekao SA
- Centrum Bankowości Bezpośredniej Sp. z o.o. (call center)
- Pekao Leasing Sp. z o.o.
- Pekao Investment Banking SA
- Pekao Leasing Holding SA
- Pekao Leasing Sp. z o.o.
- Pekao Faktoring Sp. z o.o.
- Pekao Pioneer Powszechne Towarzystwo Emerytalne SA
- Centrum Kart S.A
- Pekao Bank Hipoteczny SA (mortgage banking)
- Pekao Financial Services Sp. z o.o.
- Pekao Fundusz Kapitałowy Sp. z o.o.
- Pekao Property SA
- FPB – Media Sp. z o.o.

== Miscellaneous ==
Bank Pekao was the official bank and sponsor of the UEFA EURO in 2012.

== Gallery ==
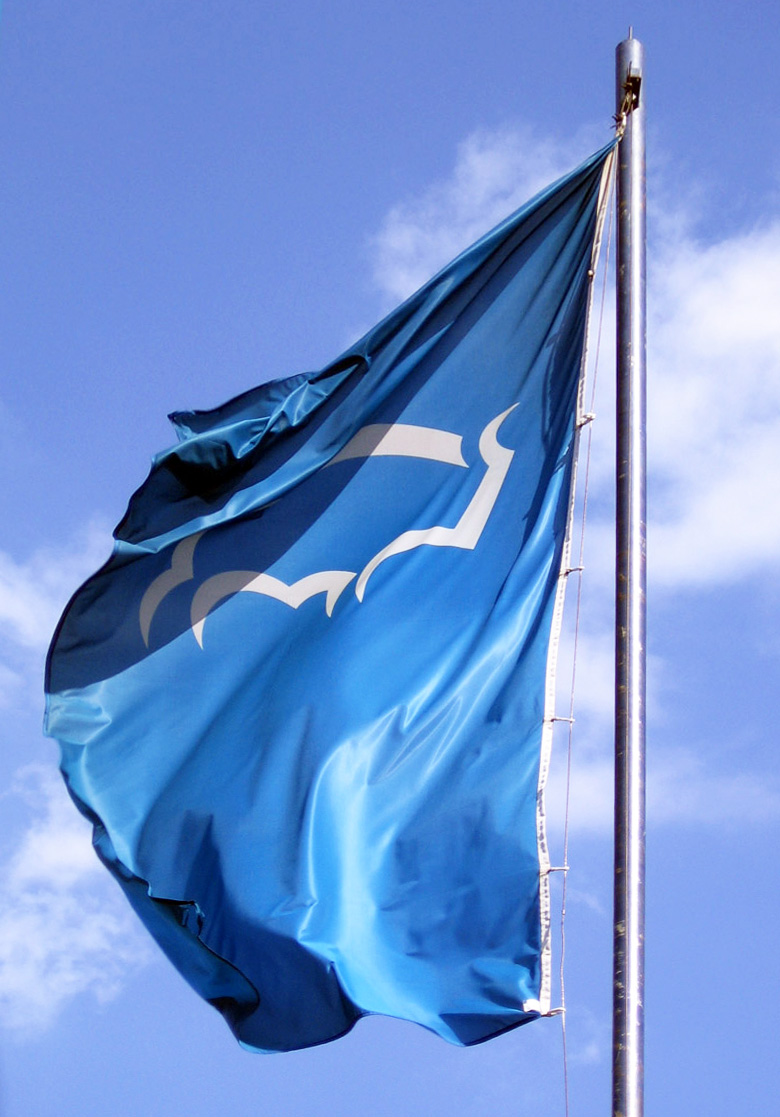
Bank Pekao SA's flag with characteristic logo

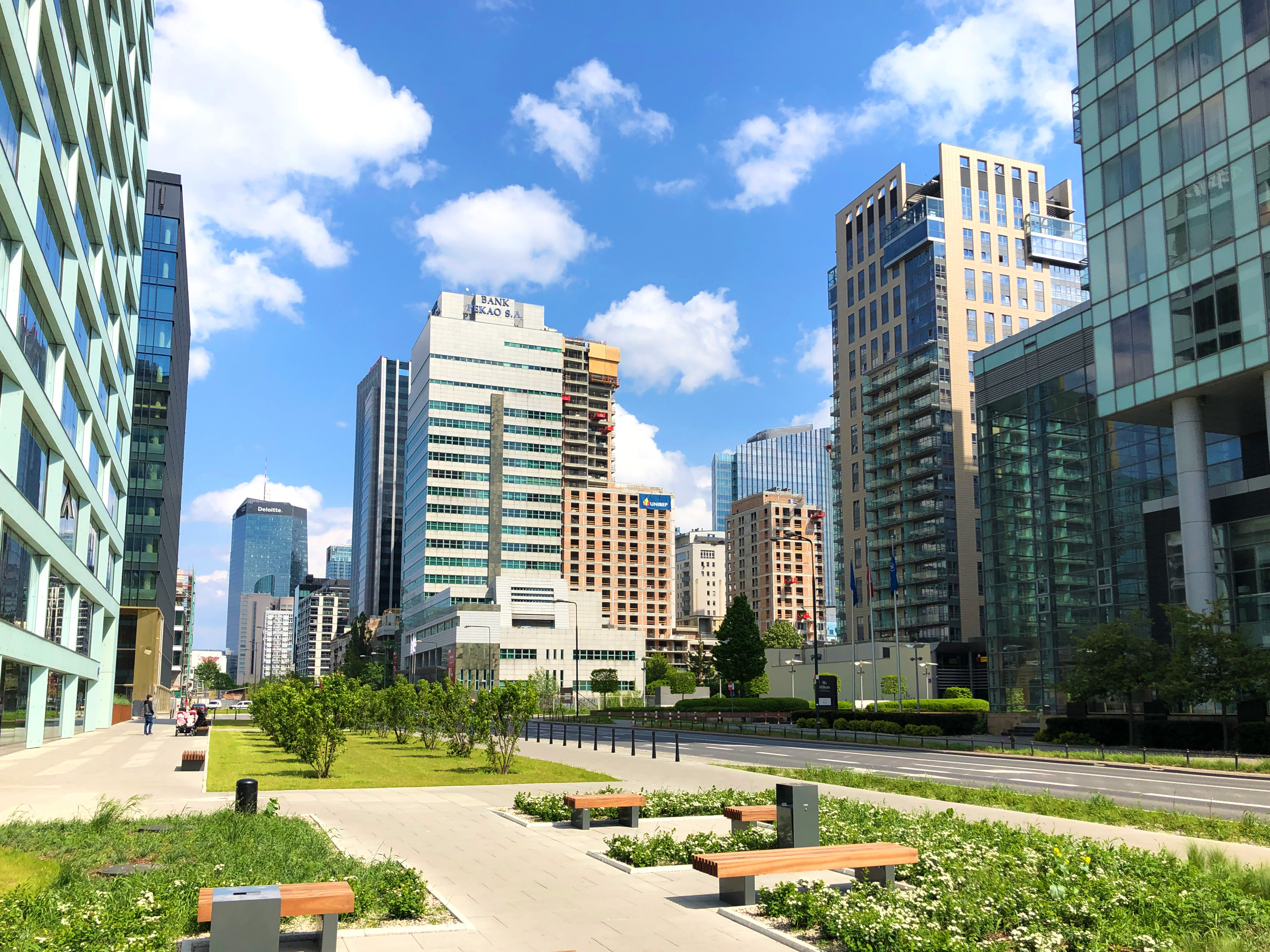
Bank Pekao SA Head Office in Warsaw

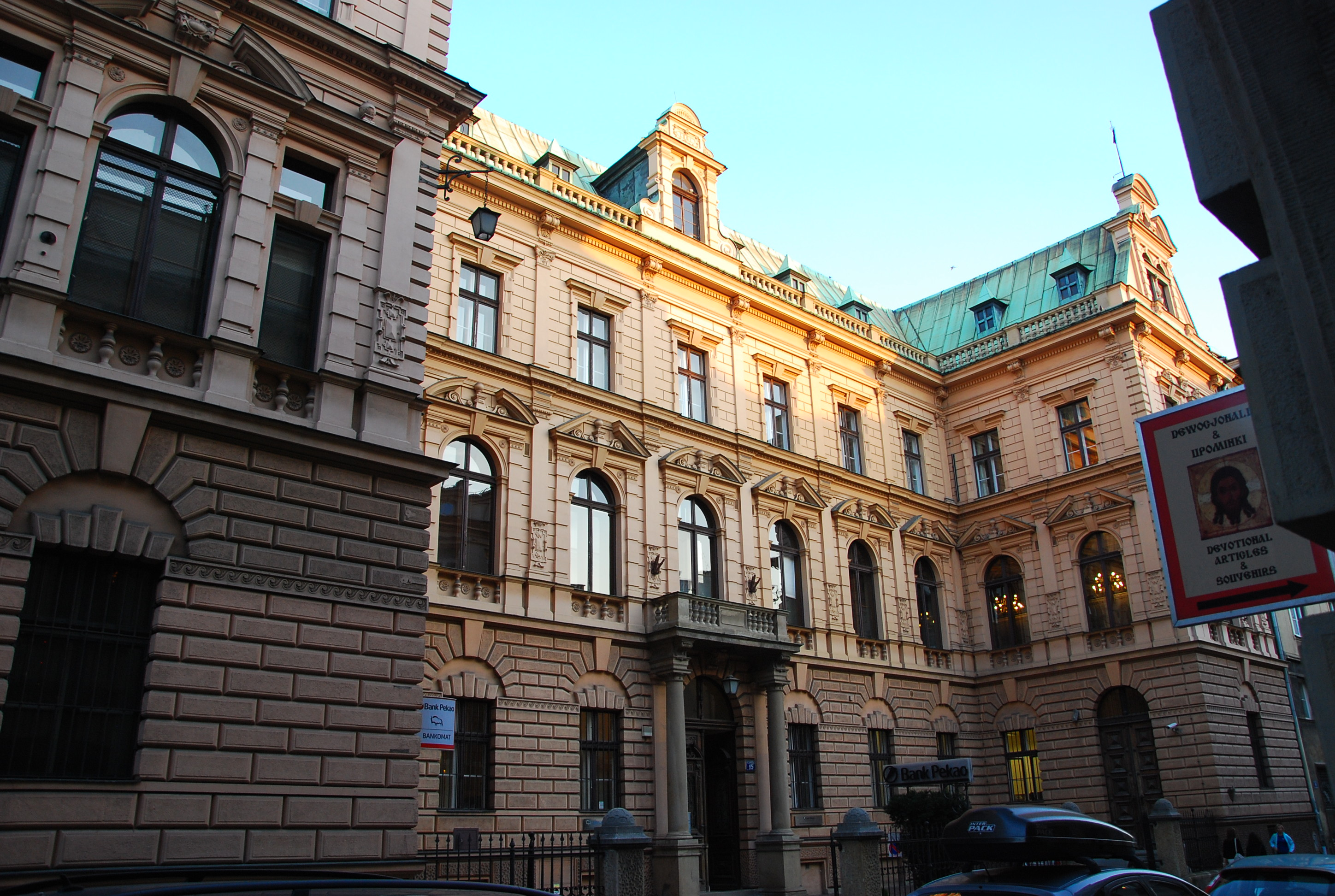
Bank Pekao Building in Kraków

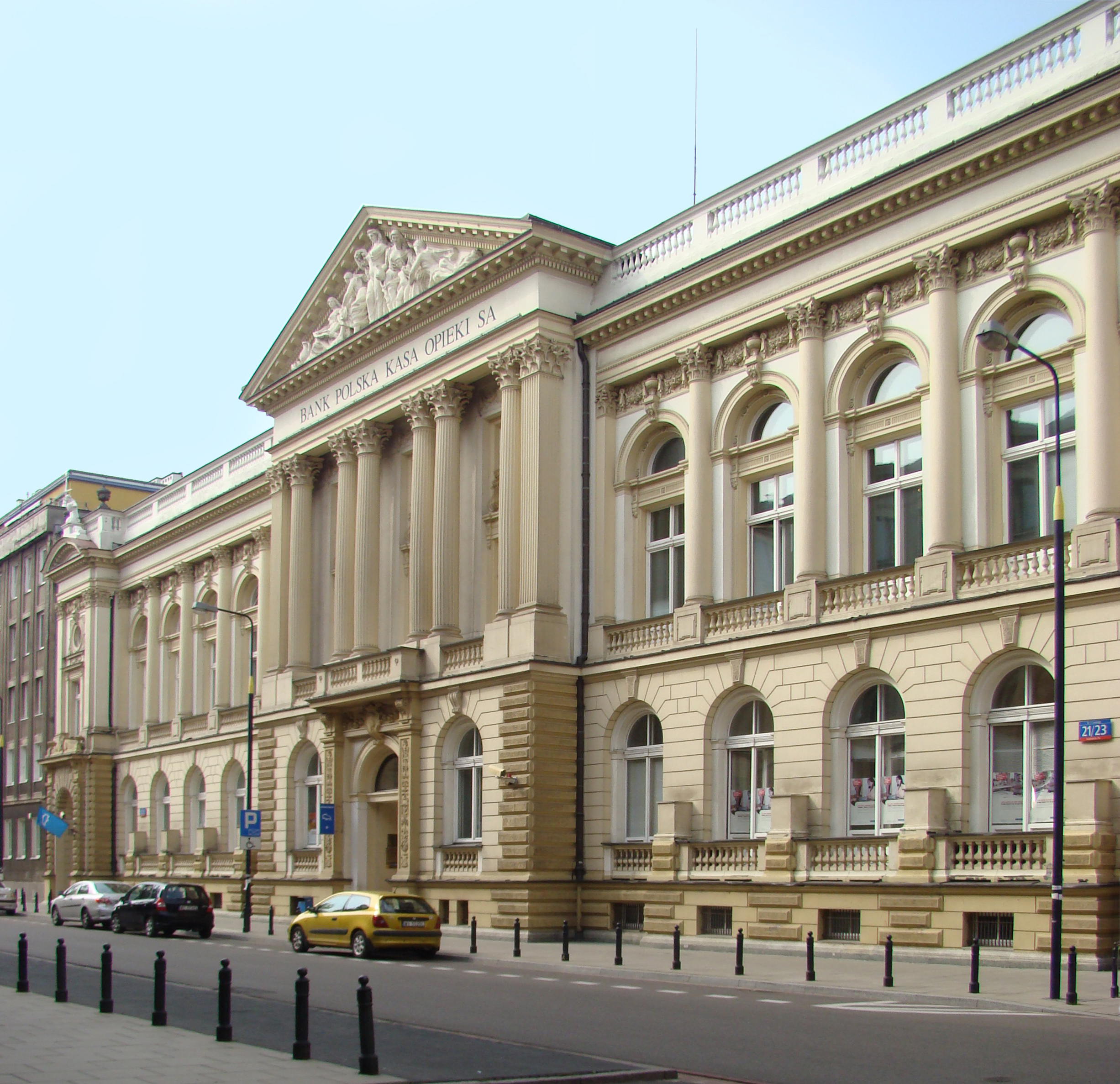
Bank Pekao in Warsaw

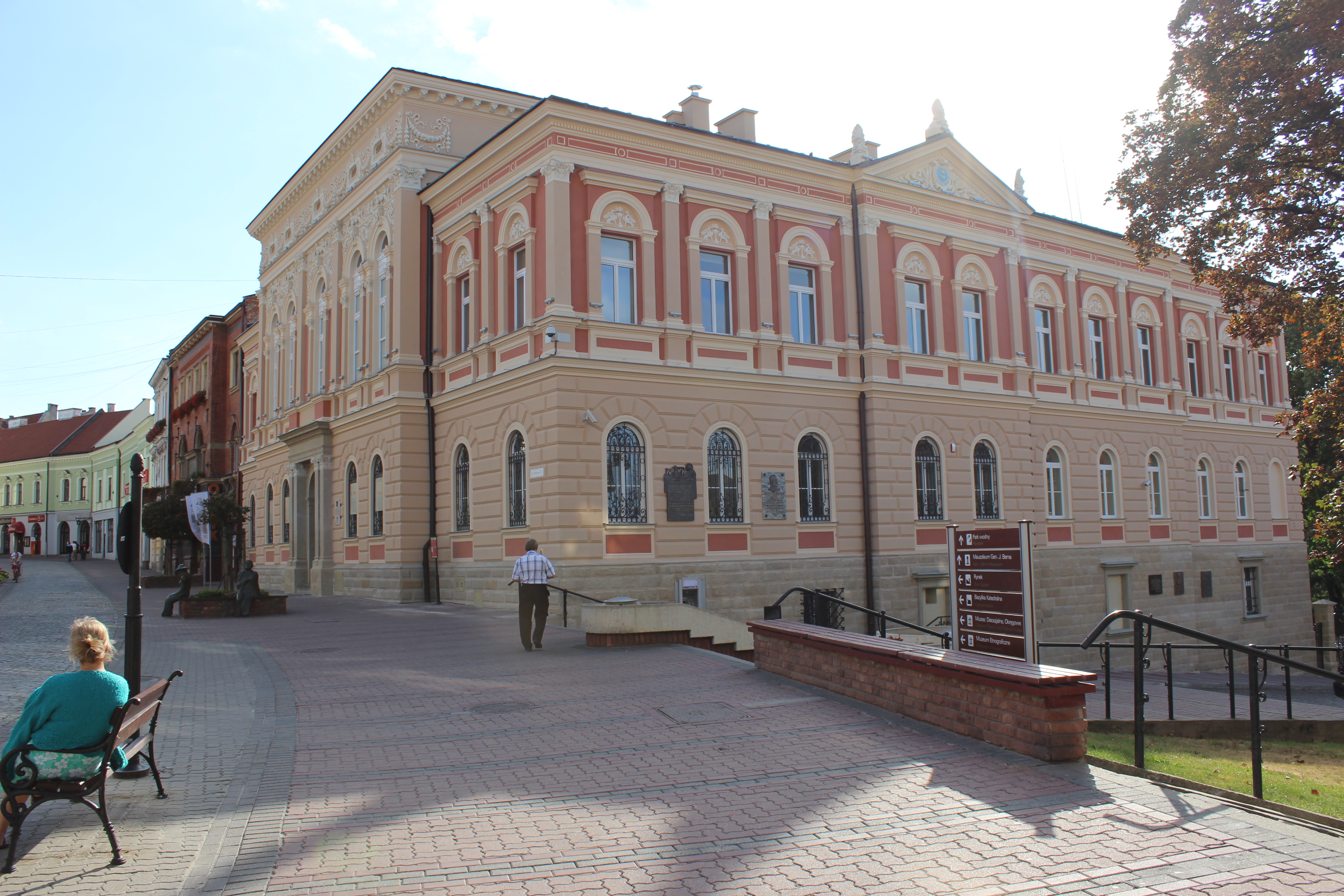
Bank Pekao in Tarnów

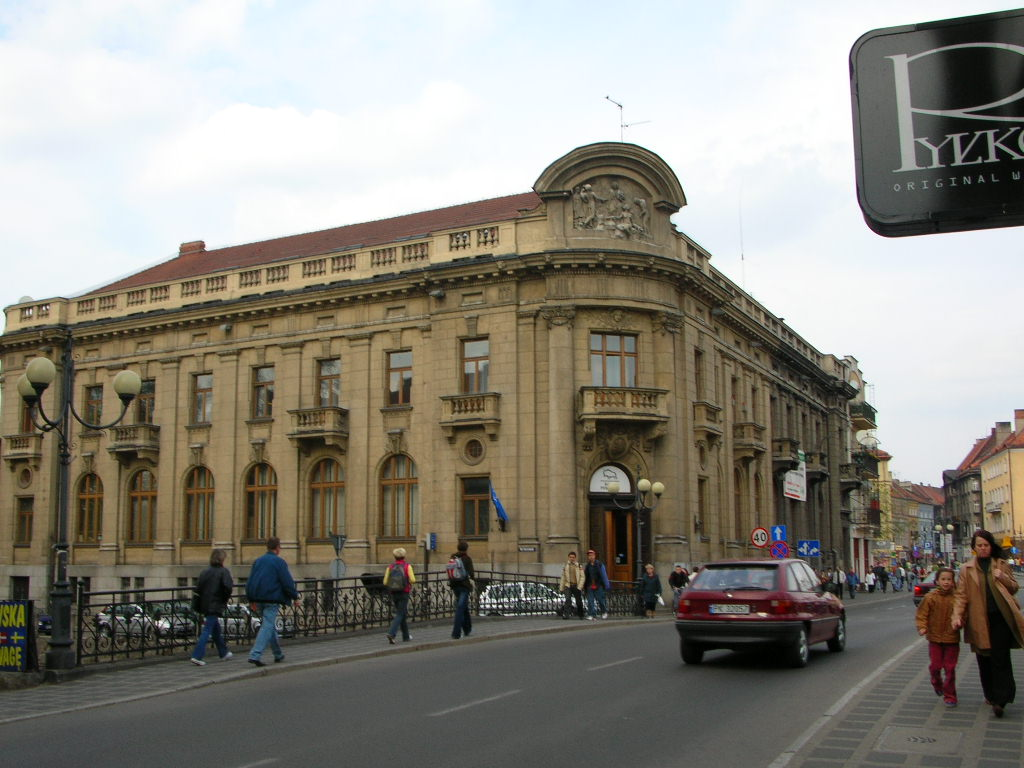
Bank Pekao in Kalisz

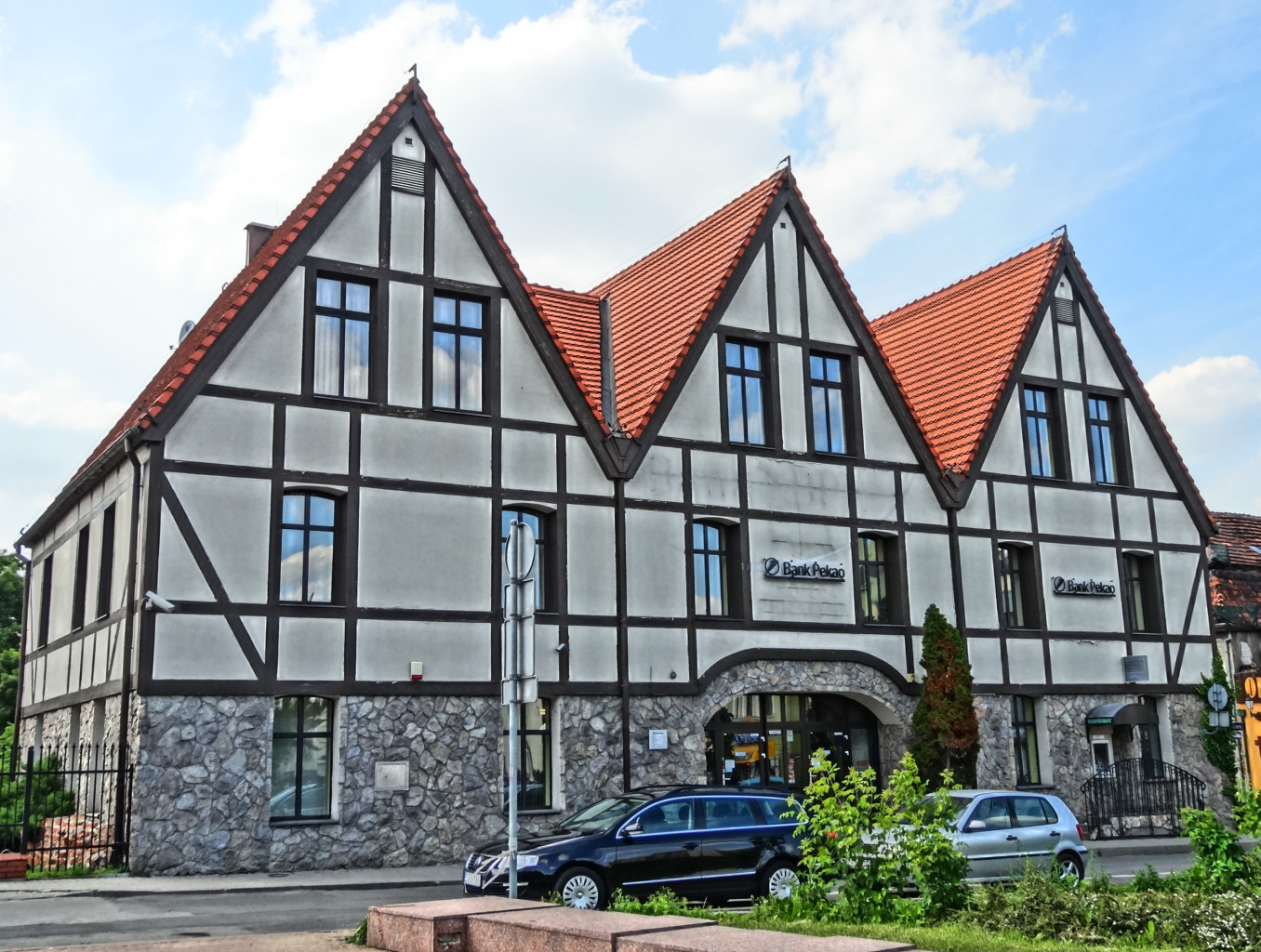
Branch of Bank Pekao in Bydgoszcz

== See also ==
- Bon PeKaO
- Ukrsotsbank
- List of banks in Poland
