= Bon Towarowy PeKaO =

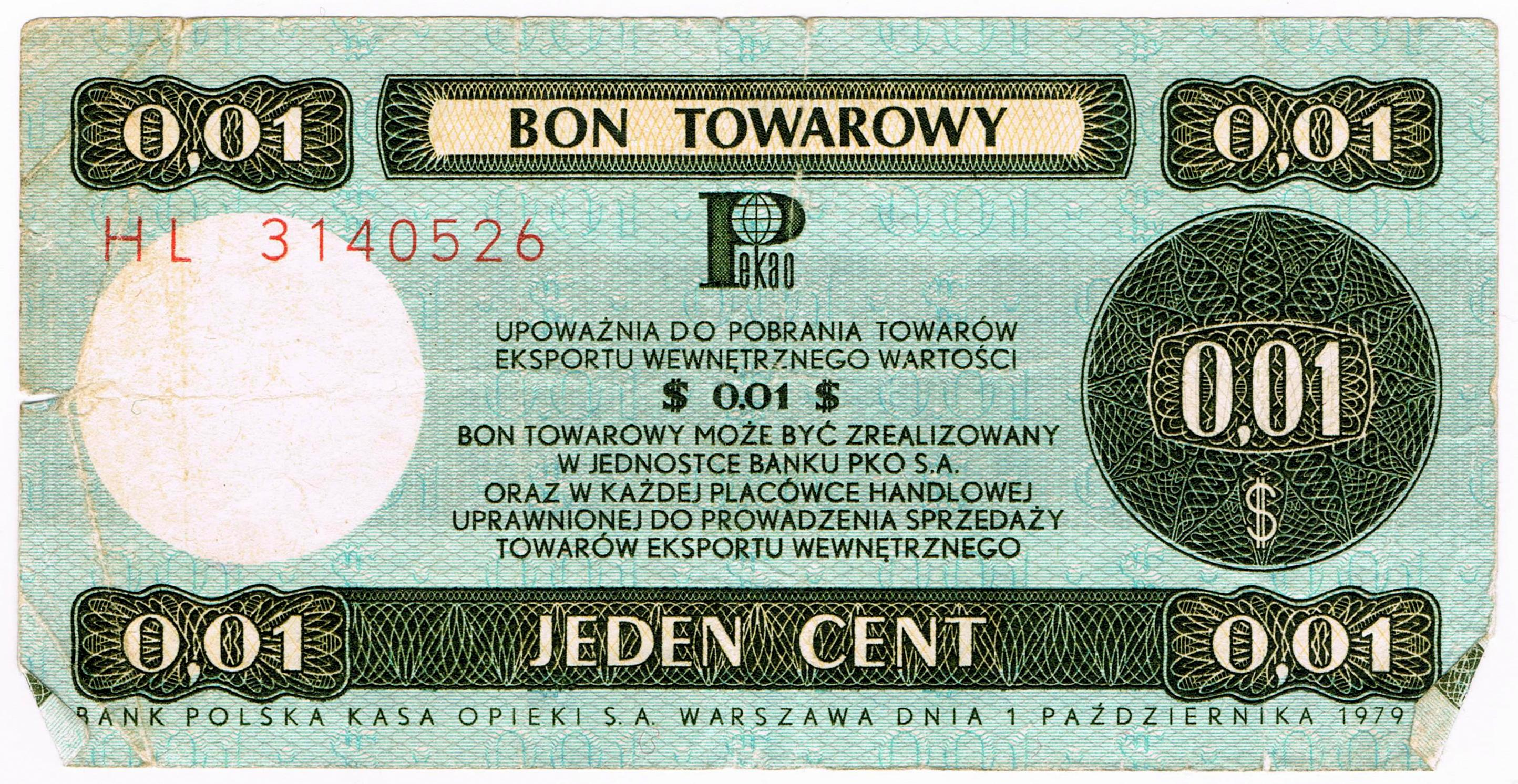
A bon valued at 1 US cent

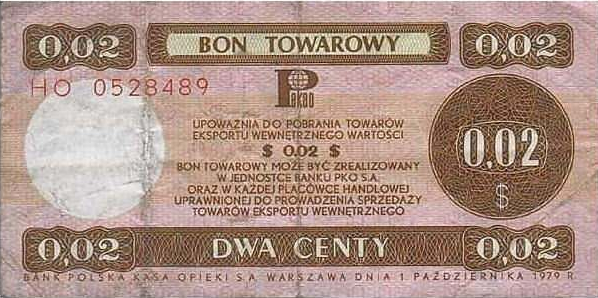
A bon valued at two US cents

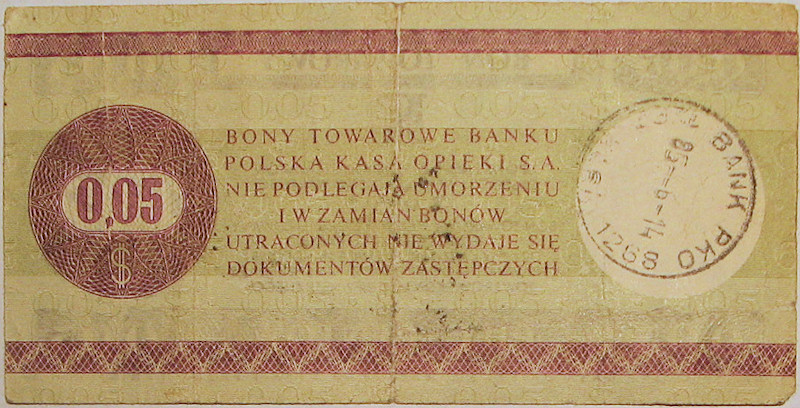
Stamped reverse of a bon valued at five US cents

Bon towarowy PeKaO (or simply Bon PeKaO) cheques were substitute legal tender (complementary currency) used in the Polish People's Republic. The Polish government, needing hard foreign currency, introduced them in 1960. Citizens of Poland had to exchange foreign currency they had into these notes (bony in Polish plural), issued by the government-controlled Bank Pekao. They were only accepted in special shops in Poland (Pewex, Baltona) where one could buy restricted, imported goods. Outside of these shops and the entire country, bons had no value and were not regarded as legal tender.

In the 1950s and the 1960s, turnover of Western currency was strictly prohibited, and since 1 January 1960, pre-World War Two currency was purchased by the national bank, which paid for it with bons. From the 1970s, these regulations were not controlled as strictly as before, which resulted in a flourishing black market of foreign currency. All Polish citizens, who received money orders from the so-called “second payments area” (pl:drugi obszar płatniczy), which covered Western Europe and North America, were not paid in real cash - dollars, pounds or marks, but instead, were issued with bons. This applied to those who received all kinds of payments from the West - salaries, pensions, monetary gifts, grants, donations.

Bon towarowy PeKaO was used only for purchases at Pewex or Baltona stores, which were controlled by the government. These stores sold imported luxury products, otherwise not available on the domestic market - candy, coffee, chocolate, liquors, household appliances, cars. In the course of time, the bon became the unofficial second currency of Poland, due to rising inflation of the złoty. In the 1960s, the price of one bon was 70-80 złoty, in the 1970s it rose to 150 zł, and in 1981, to 400 złoty. By 1989, the price of one bon was 7000 złoty, and finally, after the monetary reform of Leszek Balcerowicz, the price of one bon (equivalent to one US dollar) was established at 9500 zł. Following the collapse of the Communist system, foreign currency trade became legal, which meant that the bons lost its raison d'être.

Bons were printed in banknotes equivalent to 1 US cent, 2 cents, 5 cents, 10 cents, 20 cents, 50 cents, 1 US dollar, 2 dollars, 5 dollars, 10 dollars, 20 dollars, 50 dollars and 100 dollars. They first appeared on the market on 1 January 1960, and were almost always stamped at the back with the exception of some of the last post-1971 issue banknotes.

== See also ==
- Foreign Exchange Certificate
- Forum check
- Tuzex
- Complementary currency
