= Net interest spread =

Net interest spread refers to the difference in borrowing and lending rates of financial institutions (such as banks) in nominal terms. It is considered analogous to the gross margin of non-financial companies.

Net interest spread is expressed as interest yield on earning assets (any asset, such as a loan, that generates interest income) minus interest rates paid on borrowed funds.

Net interest spread is similar to net interest margin; net interest spread expresses the nominal average difference between borrowing and lending rates, without compensating for the fact that the amount of earning assets and borrowed funds may be different.

== Example ==
For example, a bank has average loans to customers of $100, and earns gross interest income of $6. The interest yield is 6/100 = 6%. A bank takes deposits from customers and pays 1% to those customers. The bank lends its customers money at 6%. The bank's net interest spread is 5%.

== Net Interest Spread Software ==
There are several popular commercial net interest spread software packages to help banks manage and grow their net interest spread effectively. Among these are:

- Margin Maximizer Suite - this software was originally developed by US Banking Alliance which was later purchased by ProfitStars - a Jack Henry Company. This software is coupled with an onsite consulting service. The software is installed onsite and is a Microsoft .Net-based application that must be installed on each lender's computer.
- PrecisionLender (formerly MarginPro) - an entirely web-based solution, launched in October 2009. It was developed by the original team from US Banking Alliance. It is delivered through Software as a Service (SaaS).
- Austin Associates LLC - another web based commercial loan pricing solution. Unlike PrecisionLender, it is a more traditional html web-forms-based application.

== See also ==
- Net interest margin
- Net Interest Income
