= Net interest income =

Financial ratio

Net interest income (NII) is the difference between revenues generated by interest-bearing assets and the cost of servicing (interest-burdened) liabilities. For banks, the assets typically include commercial and personal loans, mortgages, construction loans and investment securities. The liabilities consist primarily of customers' deposits. NII is the difference between (a) interest payments the bank receives on outstanding loans and (b) interest payments the bank makes to customers on their deposits.

NII = (interest payments on assets) − (interest payments on liabilities)

Depending on a bank's specific assets and liabilities (e.g., fixed or floating rate), NII may be more or less sensitive to changes in interest rates. If the bank's liabilities reprice faster than its assets, then it is said to be "liability-sensitive." Further, the bank is asset-sensitive if its liabilities reprice more slowly than its assets in a changing interest-rate environment. The exposure of NII to changes in interest rates can be measured by the dollar maturity gap (DMG), which is the difference between the dollar amount of assets that reprice and the dollar amount of liabilities that reprice within a given time period.

== See also ==
- Net interest spread
- Net interest margin
- Earnings at risk
