= Net interest margin =

Difference between interest income and interest paid

Net interest margin (NIM) is a measure of the difference between the interest income generated by banks or other financial institutions and the amount of interest paid out to their lenders (for example, deposits), relative to the amount of their (interest-earning) assets. It is similar to the gross margin (or gross profit margin) of non-financial companies.

It is usually expressed as a percentage of what the financial institution earns on loans in a time period and other assets minus the interest paid on borrowed funds divided by the average amount of the assets on which it earned income in that time period (the average earning assets).

Net interest margin is similar in concept to net interest spread, but the net interest spread is the nominal average difference between the borrowing and the lending rates, without compensating for the fact that the earning assets and the borrowed funds may be different instruments and differ in volume.

== Calculation ==
NIM is calculated as a percentage of net interest income to average interest-earning assets during a specified period. For example, a bank's average interest-earning assets (which generally includes, loans and investment securities) was $100.00 in a year while it earned interest income of $6.00 and paid interest expense of $3.00. The NIM then is computed as ($6.00 – $3.00) / $100.00 = 3%. Net interest income equals the interest earned on interest-earning assets (such as interest earned on loans and investment securities) minus the interest paid on interest-bearing liabilities (such as interest paid to customers on their deposits).

In particular, for a bank or a financial institution, if the bank or financial institution has a significant amount of non-performing assets (such as loans where full repayment is in doubt), its NIM will generally decrease because interest earned on non-performing assets is treated, for accounting purposes, as repayment of principal and not payment of interest due to the uncertainty that the loan will be fully repaid.

== See also ==
- Net interest income
