= Cezary Stypułkowski =

Polish banker and former politician

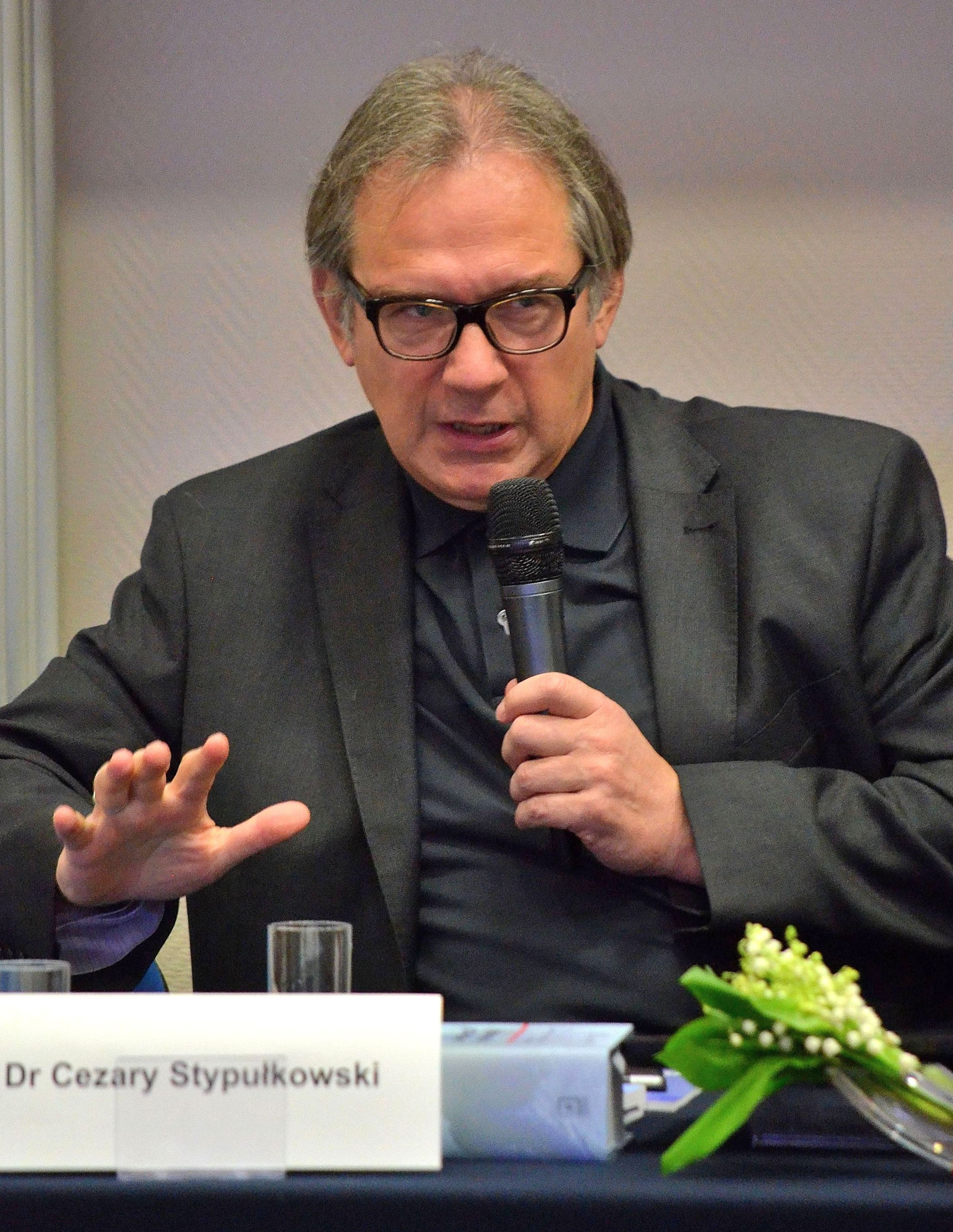
- Stypułkowski in 2014
- Born: 1956 (age 69–70); Mrągowo, Poland
- Citizenship: Polish
- Education: University of Warsaw (PhD, 1989); Columbia Business School
- Occupation: Banker
- Known for: President of the Management Board of Bank Handlowy (1991–2003), PZU (2003–2006) and mBank (2010–2024)
- Title: President of the Management Board of Bank Pekao

Cezary Stypułkowski (born 1956) is a Polish banker and former politician, who was the President of the Management Board of mBank, one of Poland's largest banks, from 2010 to 2024 and currently serves as President of the Management Board of Bank Pekao.

== Early life and career ==
Cezary Stypułkowski was born in 1956 in Mrągowo and graduated from High School No. 3 in Olsztyn in 1975. He studied at the Business School of Columbia in New York in the 1980s and earned a doctorate from the Faculty of Law and Administration of the Warsaw University in 1989. Stypułkowski also was a member of the Polish United Workers' Party until 1989. Starting in 1981, he served as an advisor to the minister in the Bureau of Governmental Representative for Economic Reforms. By 1985, he had become an advisor to the president of the Advisory Economic Council and from 1987 to 1988, he held positions as Secretary of the Committee of the Council of Ministers for Economic Reforms and as an advisor to the deputy prime minister.

== Career ==
For over ten years, from 1991 to 2003, he led Bank Handlowy's Management Board. In 2003, he was appointed as President of the Management Board of the PZU Group where he was replaced by Jaromir Netzel in 2006. Afterwards he became the managing director at J.P. Morgan Chase, where he was responsible for operations in Central and Eastern Europe. In 2010 he was then appointed as President of the Management Board of BRE Bank and in 2013 he was reappointed when the Bank rebranded to mBank. He resigned from his President of the Management Board position in July 2024. In October 2024, Stypułkowski was appointed President of the Management Board of Bank Pekao, which was approved by the Polish Financial Supervision Authority a month later.

== Board memberships ==
Cezary Stypułkowski is also a member in other boards and committees:

- Past memberships:
  - International advisory board of Deutsche Bank's board of directors
  - International advisory board of INSEAD School of Management and Businessmen
  - Council member of Institute of International Finance in Washington
  - Member of Geneva Association
- Current memberships:
  - Member of Support Committee of POLIN Museum of the History of Polish Jews in Warsaw

== See also ==
- Bank Handlowy
- Bank Pekao
