= List of largest Polish companies =

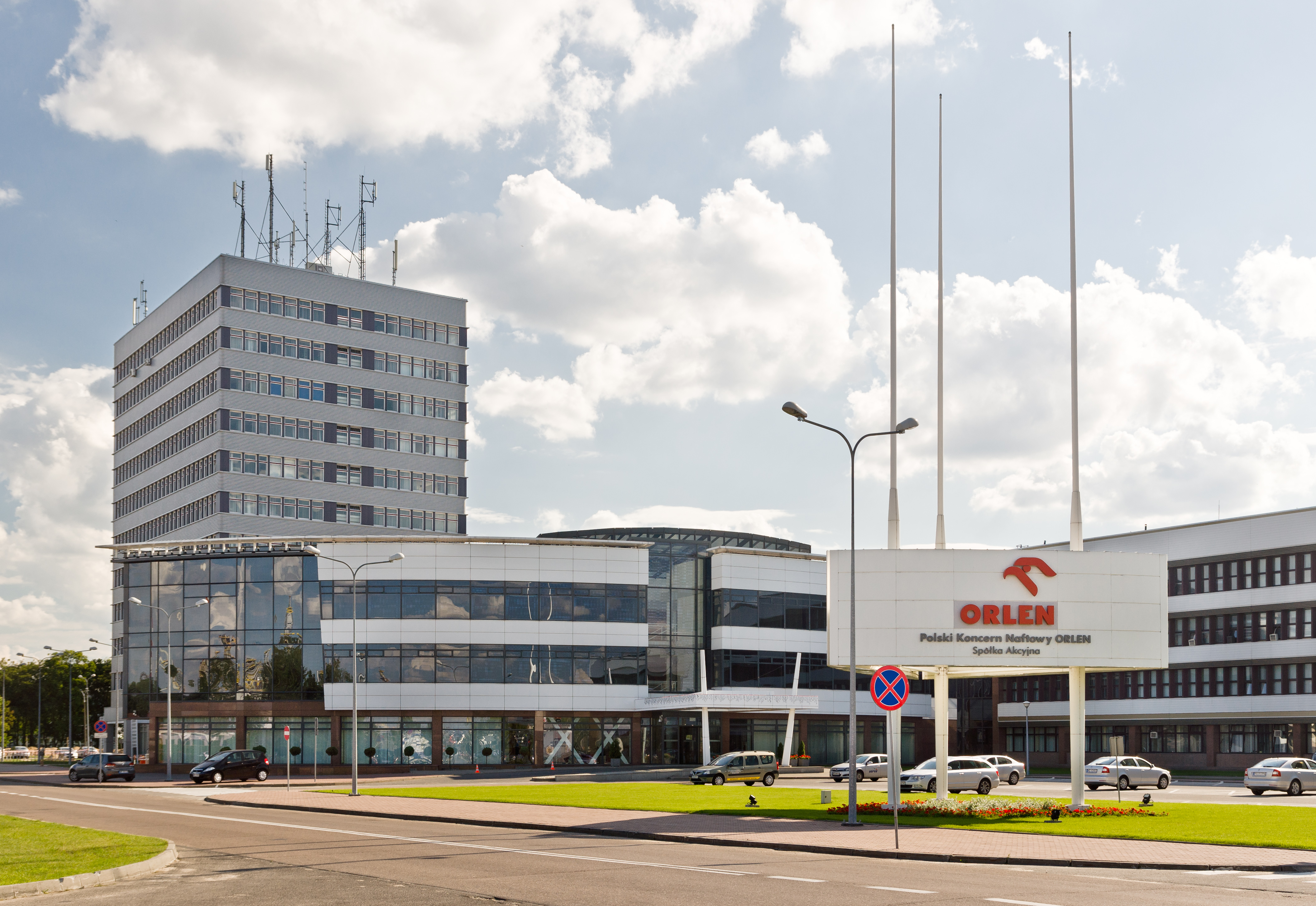
PKN Orlen headquarters in Płock

This article lists the largest Poland-owned companies in terms of their revenue, net profit, total assets, market value and employees number according to the French credit insurer Coface, the American business magazines Forbes and Fortune as well as the Polish WIG20 stock market index.

== 2025 Coface list ==
This list is based on the Coface CEE Top 500 Ranking published in 2025, which ranks the 500 largest companies in Central-Eastern Europe. The Coface list includes the data of the revenue, net profit and employee number of each company.

The table below also lists the headquarters location and industry sector of each company. The figures are in millions of Euros and are for the year 2023. Top 20 companies by revenue from Poland in the Coface CEE Top 500 Ranking are listed, excluding subsidiaries of foreign companies.

Name	Headquarters	Revenue	Profit	Employees	Industry	Majority/Plurality ownership
Name	Headquarters	EUR millions		Employees	Industry	Majority/Plurality ownership
Orlen	Płock	69,000	324	67,809	Petroleum industry	State Treasury of Poland
Totalizator Sportowy	Warsaw	16,145	112	6,847	Gambling	State Treasury of Poland
PGE	Warsaw	15,084	-722	41,975	Electricity	State Treasury of Poland
KGHM	Lubin	8,262	671	35,028	Metals, Mining, Metallurgy	State Treasury of Poland
Enea	Poznań	7,713	224	18,037	Electricity	State Treasury of Poland
Tauron	Katowice	7,611	138	18,742	Electricity	State Treasury of Poland
Dino	Krotoszyn	6,848	352	49,887	Retail	Tomasz Biernacki
PSE	Warsaw	5,942	667	2,968	Electricity	State Treasury of Poland
LPP	Gdańsk	4,724	409	22,821	Textile, Footwear	Marek Piechocki
Inter Cars	Warsaw	4,555	169	5,261	Automotive industry	Andrzej Oliszewski
Pelion	Łódź	4,306	-6	12,149	Healthcare	Jacek Szwajcowski
Asseco	Rzeszów	4,007	312	33,752	Information technology	Adam Góral
Maspex	Wadowice	3,561	180	10,039	Food	Krzysztof Pawiński
AB	Magnice	3,429	41	1270	Electronics	Andrzej Przybyło
Cyfrowy Polsat	Warsaw	3,337	182	8,219	Telecommunication	Zygmunt Solorz
Unimot	Zawadzkie	3,295	33	929	Petroleum industry	Adam Sikorski and his family
PGZ	Radom	3,260	393	20,266	Arms	State Treasury of Poland
Anwim	Warsaw	3,191	2	576	Petroleum industry	Pension Fund of Poland
Grupa Azoty	Tarnów	3,051	-252	15,163	Chemicals	State Treasury of Poland
PKP	Warsaw	3,011	-60	40,947	Rail transport	State Treasury of Poland

== 2026 Forbes list ==
This list is based on the 2026 edition of the Forbes Global 2000, which ranks the world's 2,000 largest publicly traded companies. The Forbes ranking takes into account a multitude of factors, including the revenue, net profit, total assets and market value of each company; each factor is given a weighted rank in terms of importance when considering the overall ranking.

The table below also lists the headquarters location and industry sector of each company. The figures are in billions of US dollars and are for the year 2026. All eight companies from Poland in the Forbes 2000 are listed.

Forbes Global 2000 rank	Name	Headquarters	Revenue	Profit	Assets	Value	Industry	Majority/Plurality ownership
Forbes Global 2000 rank	Name	Headquarters	USD billions				Industry	Majority/Plurality ownership
▲287	Orlen	Płock	▼71.18	▲2.96	▲73.72	▲44.57	Petroleum industry	State Treasury of Poland
▲470	PKO BP	Warsaw	▲11.36	▲2.93	▲159.29	▲33.4	Banking, Financial services	State Treasury of Poland
▼599	PZU	Warsaw	▲18.28	▲1.72	▲145.77	▲14.77	Insurance, Financial services	State Treasury of Poland
▲864	Bank Pekao	Warsaw	▲6.41	▲1.79	▲95.58	▲16.67	Banking, Financial services	State Treasury of Poland
▲1029	KGHM	Lubin	▲10.83	▲1.88	▲17.02	▲18.42	Metals, Mining, Metallurgy	State Treasury of Poland
▼1470	PGE	Warsaw	▲16.36	▼ -0.93	▲29.31	▲6.17	Electricity	State Treasury of Poland
▲1825	Tauron	Katowice	▲9.34	▲0.86	▲13.55	▲4.38	Electricity	State Treasury of Poland
▼1982	Alior Bank	Warsaw	▲2.24	▲0.63	▲28.09	▲4.33	Banking, Financial services	State Treasury of Poland

== 2026 Fortune list ==
This list is based on the 2026 edition of the Fortune Global 500, which ranks the world's 500 largest companies by annual revenue. The ranking includes net profit, total assets and employees number as well.

The table below lists Orlen as the only company from Poland in the list, along with its headquarters location and industry sector. The figures are in millions of US dollars and are for the year 2025.

Fortune Global 500 rank	Name	Headquarters	Revenue	Profit	Assets	Employees	Industry	Majority/Plurality ownership
Fortune Global 500 rank	Name	Headquarters	USD millions			Employees	Industry	Majority/Plurality ownership
▼193	Orlen	Płock	▼71,276.9	▲673.6	▲73,733	▼66,226	Petroleum industry	State Treasury of Poland

== 2026 WIG20 composition ==
The WIG20 is a capitalization-weighted stock market index of the twenty largest companies on the Warsaw Stock Exchange.

The table below also lists the headquarters location and industry sector of each company, excluding subsidiaries of foreign companies.

Name	Headquarters	Industry	Majority/Plurality ownership
PKO BP	Warsaw	Banking, Financial services	State Treasury of Poland
Orlen	Płock	Petroleum industry	State Treasury of Poland
Bank Pekao	Warsaw	Banking, Financial services	State Treasury of Poland
KGHM	Lubin	Metals, Mining, Metallurgy	State Treasury of Poland
PZU	Warsaw	Insurance, Financial services	State Treasury of Poland
LPP	Gdańsk	Clothing, Footwear	Marek Piechocki
Dino	Krotoszyn	Retail	Tomasz Biernacki
CD Projekt	Warsaw	Video games	Marcin Iwiński
Grupa Kęty	Kęty	Metals, Metallurgy	Pension Fund of Poland
PGE	Warsaw	Electricity	State Treasury of Poland
Alior Bank	Warsaw	Banking, Financial services	State Treasury of Poland
Tauron	Katowice	Electricity	State Treasury of Poland
Kruk	Wrocław	Debt collection	Pension Fund of Poland
Modivo	Polkowice	Clothing	Dariusz Miłek

== See also ==
- List of companies of Poland
- List of largest companies by revenue
