= Cyber Folks =

cyber_Folks S.A.
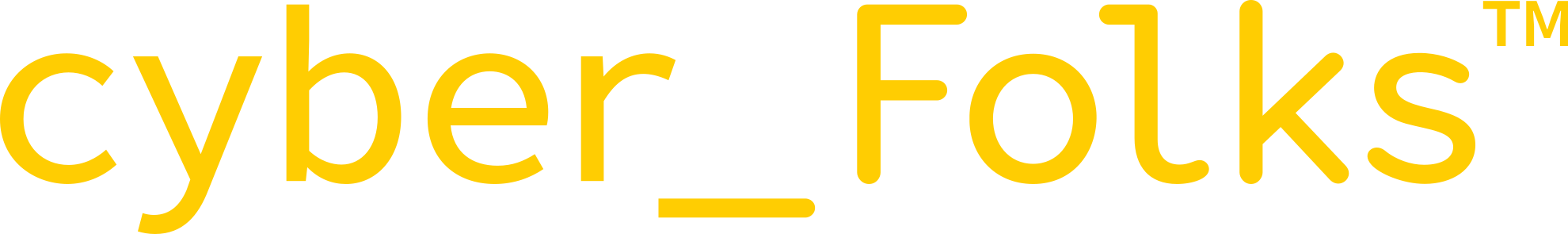
- Formerly: Spider (1999–2017); R22 S.A. (2017–2023)
- Type: Public
- Traded as: WSE: CBF
- ISIN: PLR220000018
- Industry: Web hosting; Domain registration; CPaaS; E-commerce
- Founded: 1999; 27 years ago in Poznań, Poland
- Founders: Jakub Dwernicki; Robert Dwernicki
- Headquarters: ul. Wierzbięcice 1B, Poznań, Poland
- Area served: Worldwide (100+ countries)
- Key people: Jakub Dwernicki (CEO); Robert Stasik (CFO); Katarzyna Juszkiewicz (COO); Jacek Duch (Chairman)
- Brands: cyber_Folks; Shoper; Vercom; MailerLite; PrestaShop; Sylius
- Services: Web hosting; Domain name registration; SaaS e-commerce software; CPaaS
- Revenue: ▲PLN 856 million (2025); PLN 657 million (2024)
- Operating income: PLN 134 million (2024)
- Net income: PLN 154 million; (2024)
- Total assets: PLN 943 million (2024)
- Total equity: PLN 324 million (2024)
- Number of employees: 465 (2024)
- Subsidiaries: Vercom; Shoper; MailerLite; PrestaShop; Sylius
- Website: cyberfolks.pl

cyber_Folks S.A. (known until 2023 as R22 S.A.) is a Polish capital group headquartered in Poznań, operating in the technology sector. The company provides business digitalisation solutions, including web hosting services, domain registration, SaaS and open-source software for the e-commerce sector, and multichannel electronic communication platforms (CPaaS). Since 2017, the company has been listed on the Warsaw Stock Exchange.

In 2024, the group served nearly 400,000 customers in over 100 countries. According to CEO Jakub Dwernicki, as of 2024 approximately one-third of all Polish websites were hosted on the company's servers. In 2026, following the acquisition of PrestaShop, the number of the company's customers grew to approximately 700,000 worldwide.

== History ==
=== Origins and early internet services ===
In 1999, brothers Jakub and Robert Dwernicki founded the company Spider, one of the first web hosting providers in Poland.

In 2005, the founders established Vercom, a company conducting hosting and telecommunications activities. It initially served as an in-house software house, and later became the foundation of the group's CPaaS segment.

In 2015, following funding of approximately PLN 30 million from the 3TS Capital Partners fund, the company began acquiring other companies in the market. The capital was directed to H88 S.A., a subsidiary acting as a sub-holding for the hosting segment.

Between 2015 and 2017, the group invested over PLN 60 million and acquired the brands Domeny.pl, Linuxpl.com, Futurehost.pl, Hekko.pl, SuperHost.pl, Biznes-Host.pl, blink.pl, and Active24.pl. These brands were integrated into H88 on the basis of the Poznań-based company Ogicom. During this period, revenue in the hosting segment grew from PLN 8 million in 2015 to PLN 74 million in the 2016/2017 fiscal year.

=== Stock exchange listing and brand consolidation (2017–2023) ===
In December 2017, the company debuted on the Warsaw Stock Exchange under the name R22 S.A.

In the same month, R22 acquired the hosting brand Kei.pl for PLN 22 million, taking over approximately 14,000 customers and 18,000 managed domains.

In 2018–2019, the group acquired six Romanian hosting companies (including TLH, HostVision, and Rohost). According to company data from that period, it became one of the largest hosting operators in Romania.

In 2019, R22 bought out a 28.5% stake in H88 from 3TS Capital Partners for €6.8 million, gaining full control of the hosting segment. That same year, the company paid its first dividend.

In 2020, the hosting brand cyber_Folks was established to integrate numerous smaller brands in the group's portfolio in Poland and other Central and Eastern European countries (including Romania). At the time of its creation, the brand served over 100,000 customers.

Also in 2020, the CPaaS segment was organisationally separated within Vercom S.A. In 2022, Vercom conducted its own initial public offering and debuted on the WSE, becoming the second publicly listed entity within the capital group.

Following a merger between R22 S.A. and its subsidiary cyber_Folks S.A., the company changed its name to cyber_Folks S.A. Since 3 August 2023, shares of the company have been traded on the WSE under the abbreviated name "CYBERFLKS" and the ticker symbol CBF.

As of April 2026, the company is a constituent of the following stock indices: GPWB-CENTR, WIG140, WIGtechTR, CEEplus, mWIG40TR, WIGdiv, WIG-Poland, mWIG40, and WIG.

== Business model ==
The cyber_Folks group operates across three main business segments.

=== Hosting and domains (cyber_Folks) ===
This segment provides shared hosting, VPS servers (root KVM and managed DirectAdmin), domain registration and maintenance, SSL certificates, and website-building tools.

The group operates in the Polish, Croatian, and Romanian markets. In Romania, it manages approximately 19,000 domains, including through its acquired company Hosterion.

=== CPaaS communications (Vercom) ===
Subsidiary Vercom and other related entities provide automated multichannel communication services in the CPaaS model. The platforms integrate communication channels such as SMS, email, push notifications, voice messages, OTT, and RCS.

=== E-commerce ===
This segment provides software for electronic commerce in both SaaS and open-source models. This includes toolsets offered by the Shoper platform (SaaS), PrestaShop, and Sylius (open source) for building online stores, logistics and payment gateway integrations, as well as sales automation tools such as Apilo, SellIntegro, and Blugento.

== Acquisitions ==
The cyber_Folks group has completed more than 30 acquisitions, including FreshMail, PushPushGo, and SellIntegro. Key transactions include:

- Zenbox (2021) – acquisition of a Polish hosting company for PLN 18 million, gaining 22,700 customers.
- MailerLite (2022) – acquisition of an American email marketing software provider. The estimated transaction value was over €80 million.
- Shoper (2025) – acquisition of a 49.9% stake for a total of PLN 547.5 million (PLN 39 per share).
- Hosterion (2025) – acquisition of a Romanian hosting company for €6.7 million.
- PrestaShop and Sylius (2025–2026) – in 2025, cyber_Folks, in cooperation with Sylius, agreed to acquire 100% of shares in the French e-commerce platform PrestaShop for €55 million through the special purpose vehicle cyber_Pixel. In February 2026, the planned investment in Sylius and its related company BitBag was also finalised. Following the merger of PrestaShop—serving approximately 230,000 stores—with the Shoper and Sylius ecosystem, the gross merchandise value (GMV) of transactions processed in this ecosystem was projected to reach approximately €35 billion.

To raise funds for further acquisitions (valued between €15 and €150 million), in September 2025 the company issued Series E shares, raising PLN 204.2 million.

== Financial results ==
In Q1 2025, revenue amounted to PLN 190.5 million, with net profit attributable to shareholders of the parent company reaching PLN 13.3 million. In Q4 2025, the estimated net profit stood at PLN 44.4 million. Management set a target of PLN 220 million EBITDA in 2025 and PLN 310 million in 2027.

In 2025, the cyber_Folks group's net revenues amounted to PLN 856 million (a 30% increase from PLN 657 million in 2024), with adjusted EBITDA reaching PLN 292 million.

== Management and shareholding ==
The company's management board consists of: CEO Jakub Dwernicki (responsible for development and acquisitions), CFO Robert Stasik, Chief Operating Officer Katarzyna Juszkiewicz, and board members Artur Pajkert and Konrad Kowalski.

Major shareholders (as of April 2026):

- Jacek Duch (including controlled entities) – 25.19%
- Jakub Dwernicki (including controlled entities) – 16.15%
- Nationale-Nederlanden Powszechne Towarzystwo Emerytalne S.A. – 6.04%
- Powszechne Towarzystwo Emerytalne Allianz Polska S.A. – 5.32%
- Free float: 38.92%

== Own products ==
The company develops proprietary software for small and medium-sized enterprises. Its portfolio includes the _now creator, an AI-powered tool that generates a website within 60 to 90 seconds based on user inputs.

== Awards and recognition ==
- In 2023, CEO Jakub Dwernicki became a finalist for the Polish Business Roundtable Award (PRB Award) in the "Success" category, in recognition of the capital group's development and acquisition strategy in Central and Eastern Europe.
- In 2024, the _Now tool received the "Master of AI Experience" award at the Masters&Robots technology conference.
- In 2025, the company was selected as the subject company in the Polish edition of the CFA Institute Research Challenge analytical competition. The company's founder received a Special Award in the EY Entrepreneur of the Year competition for building the scale of the company.

== See also ==
- Software as a Service
- E-commerce
- Web hosting service
- Domain name
