= Paweł Jarski =

Polish businessman (born 1979)

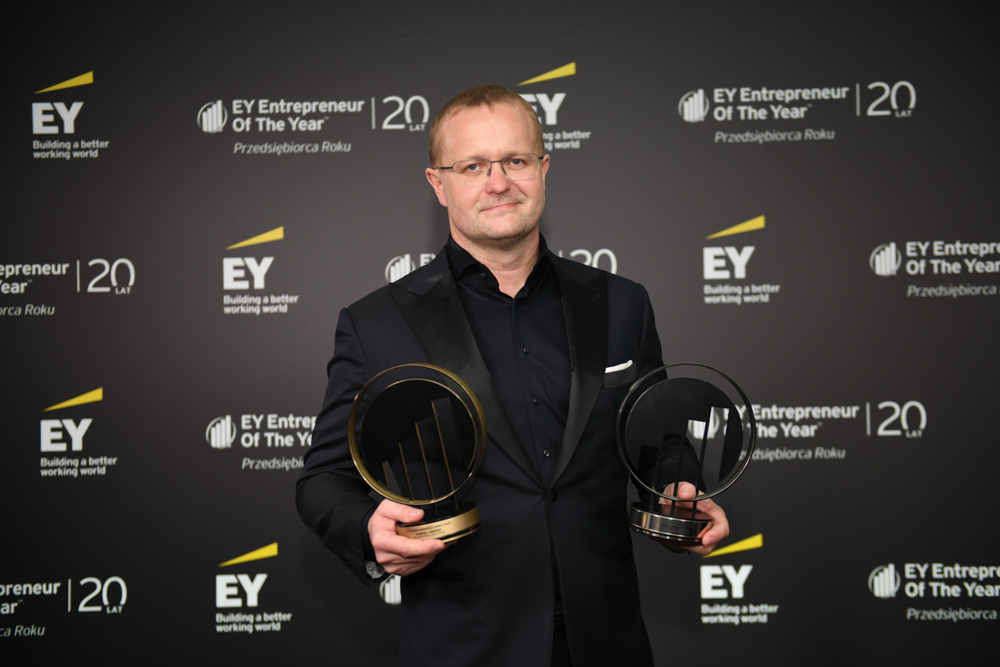
- Born: 29 czerwca 1979; Poniatowa, Poland
- Education: Akademii Leona Koźmińskiego
- Occupations: Entrepreneur; Investor
- Known for: Founder of Grupy Elemental,

Paweł Jarski (born June 29, 1979, in Poniatowa) is a Polish entrepreneur, manager, and investor. He is the founding president of Elemental Holding Group and President of the Polish Triathlon Association and member of the Board of the Polish Olympic Committee.

== Biography ==
In 2010 Paweł founded Elemental Holding SA and became president and managing director. Later in 2012, under his leadership, Elemental Holding debuted on the Warsaw Stock Exchange, where it remained until early 2021.

On December 17, 2016, he was elected President of the Polish Triathlon Association. On February 7, 2017, he became a member of the Board of the Polish Olympic Committee from the list of Polish Olympic sports associations. In December 2021, he was re-elected to both positions.

In the 2016 edition, Harvard Business Review rewarded Paweł by mentioning him in the category of CEOs of the best-managed companies in the GPW ranking.

In 2022, he won the grand prize of the Polish edition of the EY Entrepreneur of the Year competition.

In 2023, he was a winner in the BrandMe CEO competition organized and in the "Innovation Diamonds 2023" competition in the CEO of the Year category organized by Executive Club.

Paweł Jarski won the title - "Entrepreneur of the Year" by Money.pl and "The Kozminski Lions" in the category Entrepreneur in 2024.

In 2024, the Elemental Group, under the leadership of Paweł Jarski, made history by becoming the first patron of a university in Poland - the Leon Kozminski Academy. They pledged to donate PLN 2.4 million over three years to the university's endowment fund, marking a significant milestone as the first of its kind in the Polish academic community.

== Awards ==
- Harvard Business Review - CEOs of the best-managed companies in the GPW ranking (2016)
- EY Entrepreneur of the Year 2022
- BrandMe CEO (2023)
- "Innovation Diamonds" - CEO of the Year by Executive Club (2023).
- "Entrepreneur of the Year" by Money.pl (2024)
- "The Kozminski Lions" (2024)
- "35th Anniversary of Economic Freedom" by Money.pl (2024)
