= WIG =

WIG, originally an acronym for Warszawski Indeks Giełdowy (Warsaw Stock Exchange Index) is the oldest index of the Warsaw Stock Exchange.

The WIG index was introduced on 16 April 1991, the first day of trading on the Warsaw Exchange after the exchange was re-established after the fall of Communism in Poland. WIG lists 330 companies (as of 8 November 2023).

== WIG subindices ==
- WIG20
- WIG30
- MWIG40 (before MIDWIG)
- SWIG80 (before WIRR)
- TECHWIG
- WIG-BANKI
- WIG-BUDOW
- WIG-INFO
- WIG-MEDIA
- WIG-PALIWA
- WIG-SPOŻY
- WIG-TELKO
- WIG-PL
