= WIG20 =

Polish stock market index

The WIG20 is a capitalization-weighted stock market index of the twenty largest companies on the Warsaw Stock Exchange. Established on April 16, 1994. WIG is an acronym for "Warszawski Indeks Giełdowy", which translates to Warsaw Stock Index in Polish. However, so that no sector would dominate the index, the rule was introduced that there can be a maximum of 5 companies per sector. In this way, for example, there are 5 banks in the index. Companies also have different shares in the index, with clear consequences.

The all-time high of the index is 3,940.53 points, set during the intraday on 29 October 2007.

In 2013, a new stock market index WIG30 was created. It lists the 30 major Polish blue chip companies on the WSE Main Market.

== Annual Returns ==
The following table shows the annual development of the WIG20 since 1991.

Year	Closing level	Change in index in points	Change in index in %
1991	90.90		
1992	102.90	12.00	13.20
1993	1,229.80	1,126.90	1,095.14
1994	732.00	−497.80	−40.48
1995	791.90	59.90	8.18
1996	1,441.80	649.90	82.07
1997	1,487.20	45.40	3.15
1998	1,241.20	−246.00	−16.54
1999	1,788.60	547.40	44.10
2000	1,816.19	27.59	1.54
2001	1,208.34	−607.75	−33.47
2002	1,175.64	−32.70	−2.71
2003	1,574.04	398.40	33.89
2004	1,960.57	386.53	24.56
2005	2,654.95	694.38	35.42
2006	3,285.49	630.54	23.75
2007	3,456.05	170.56	5.19
2008	1,789.73	−1,666.32	−48.21
2009	2,388.72	598.99	33.47
2010	2,744.17	355.45	14.88
2011	2,144.48	−599.69	−21.85
2012	2,582.98	438.50	20.45
2013	2,400.98	−182.00	−7.05
2014	2,315.94	−85.04	−3.54
2015	1,859.15	−456.79	−19.72
2016	1,947.92	88.77	4.77
2017	2,461.21	513.29	26.35
2018	2,276.63	−184.58	−7.50
2019	2,150.09	−126.54	−5.56
2020	1,983.98	−166.11	−7.73
2021	2,266.92	282.94	14.26
2022	1,792.01	−474.91	−20.95
2023	2,342.99	550.98	30.75
2024	2,192.01	−150.98	−6.44
2025	3,184.02	992.01	45.26

== Composition ==
=== 2026 ===
- PKO BP
- PKN Orlen
- Pekao
- KGHM
- PZU
- LPP
- Erste Bank Polska (formerly Santander Bank Polska, rebranded in April 2026)
- Allegro
- CD Projekt
- Dino
- mBank
- Żabka
- Alior Bank
- Grupa Kęty
- Tauron
- PGE
- Budimex
- Kruk (Polish company)
- Pepco
- Modivo (formerly CCC)

== Investing in WIG20 ==
=== Index ETFs ===
Exchange-traded funds that track the index include:

- Expat Poland WIG20 UCITS ETF - a passive index fund traded in euro and listed in Frankfurt on Xetra (ticker PLX, ISIN BGPLWIG04173). The fund acts as a conduit for capital flows between the international financial markets and the Polish capital market.
- Beta ETF WIG20TR - a passive index fund traded in Polish złoty and listed on the Warsaw Stock Exchange (ticker ETFBW20TR, ISIN PLBTETF00015).
- PZU ETF WIG20 TR + mWIG40 TR - a passive index fund managed by TFI PZU, traded in Polish złoty and listed on the Warsaw Stock Exchange (ticker ETFPZUW20M40, ISIN PLPZUTR00013).
