= Alior Bank =

Large universal bank in Poland

Alior Bank SA

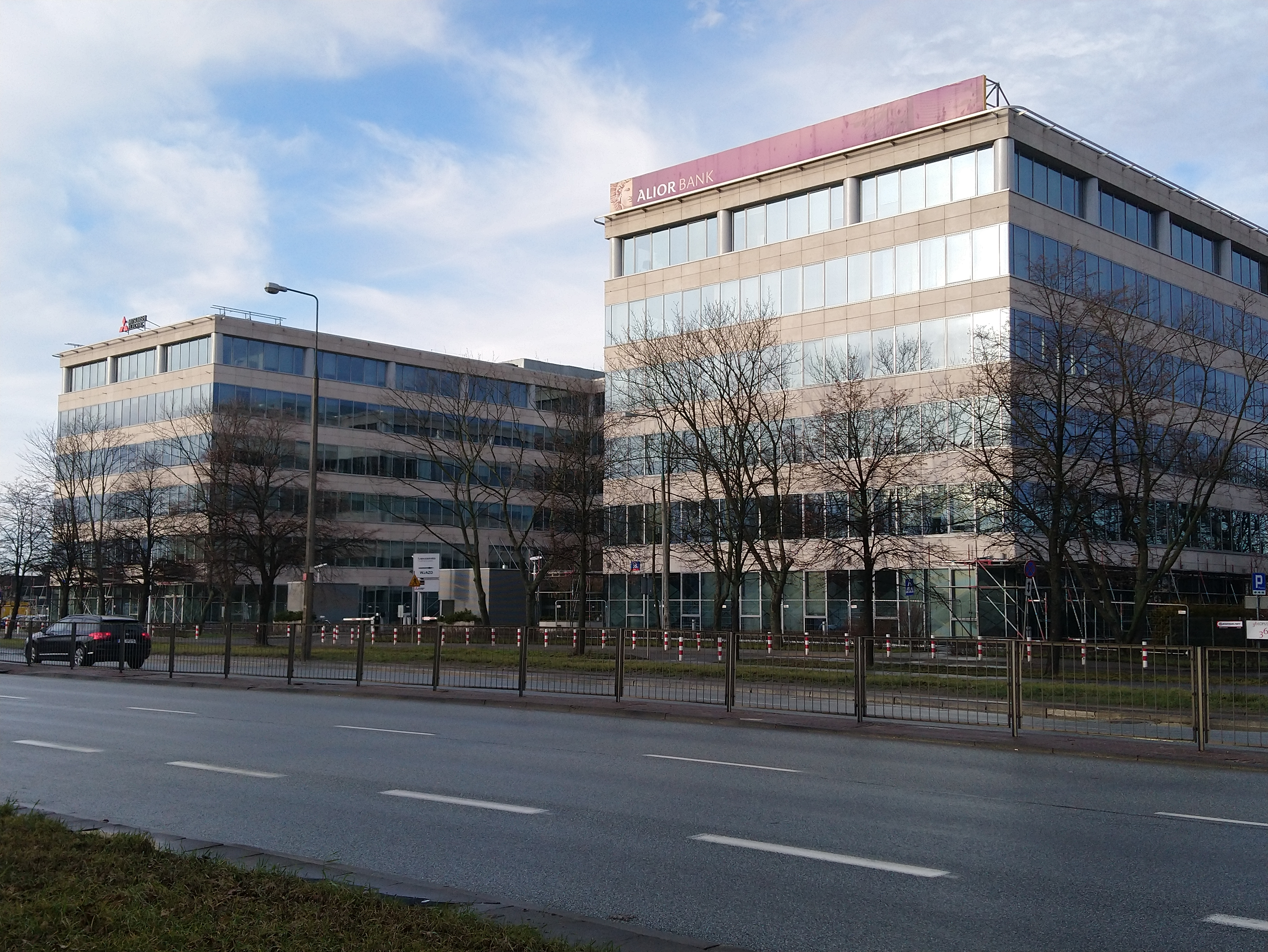
- The registered office of Alior Bank at ul. Łopuszańska 38D in Warsaw
- Type: Spółka Akcyjna
- Traded as: WSE: ALR; WIG30 Component
- Industry: banking, financial services
- Founded: April 18, 2008; 18 years ago
- Founder: Carlo Tassara S.p.A.
- Headquarters: Warsaw, Poland
- Area served: Poland, Romania
- Key people: Piotr Żabski (President of the Management Board)
- Revenue: $2.12 billion (2025)
- Net income: $588.7 million (2025)
- Total assets: $24.91 billion (2025)
- Owner: Grupa PZU (32%)
- Number of employees: 8,143 (2019)
- Website: www.aliorbank.pl

Alior Bank SA is a universal bank in Poland founded in 2008. It has been a subsidiary of insurance company PZU SA since 2015 and forms the 10th largest banking group in the country, with more than 8,143 employees as of the end of 2019. It is listed on the Warsaw Stock Exchange (WSE) and is a component of the WIG30 stock market index.

== History ==
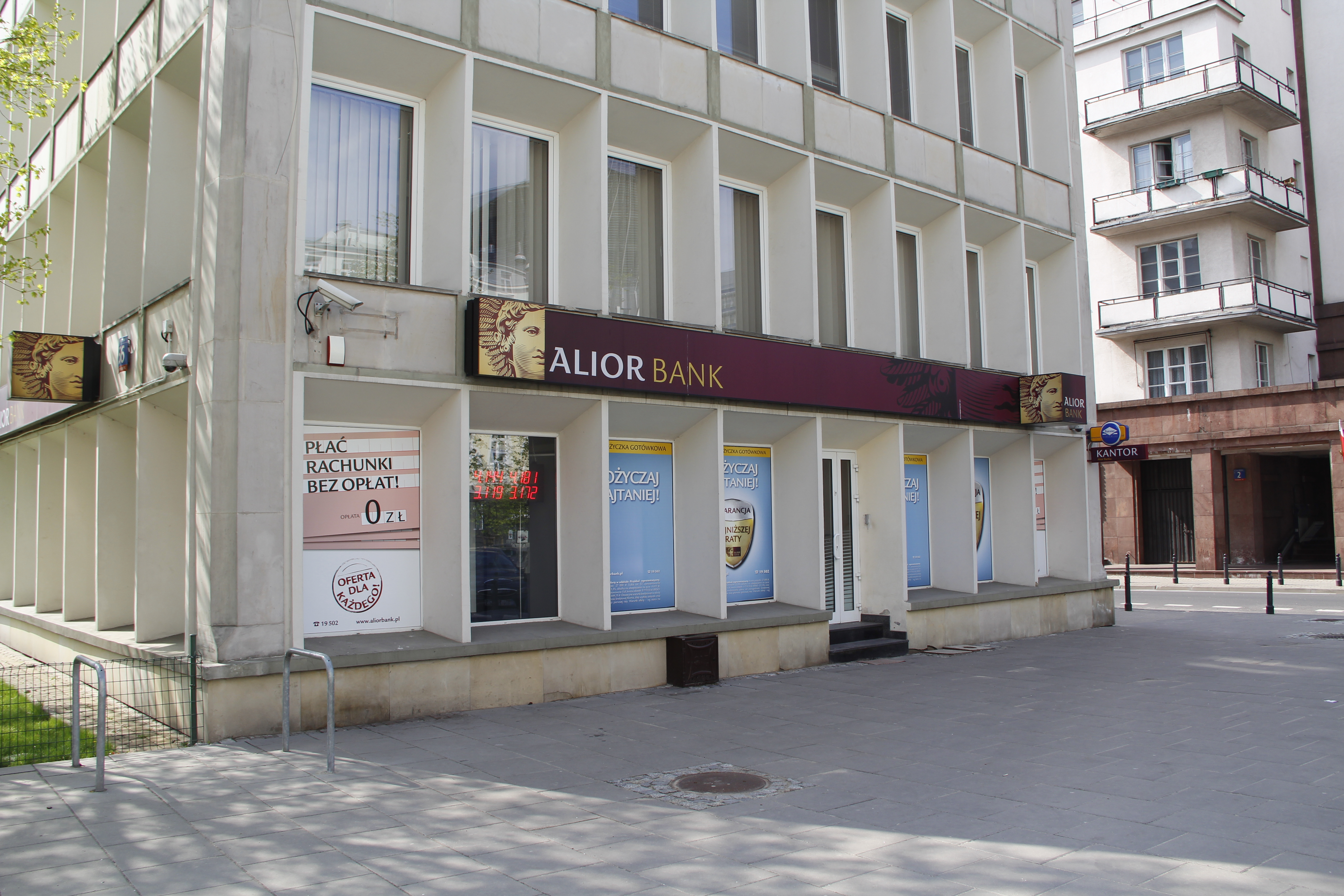
A branch of Alior Bank in Warsaw

Founded in 2008 by an Italian group Carlo Tassara, the bank debuted on Warsaw Stock Exchange in 2012 with an offering valued at 2.1 billion Polish złoty, the highest in the exchange's history. In 2014, Alior's stock price became part of WIG20 index.

In 2013, the bank attracted controversy when its deputy president mentioned that the bank considers collecting big data of its customers, pulling information from online social networks etc.

Since 2015, the bank commenced a series of mergers and acquisitions, most notably acquiring Meritum Bank (2015) and Bank BPH (2016). In autumn 2014, Alior Bank purchased 97.9% of Meritum Bank. On 19 February 2015 the transaction was finished.

On June 23, 2015, the Polish Financial Supervision Authority authorized the merger of Alior Bank S.A. and Meritum Bank ICB S.A. by transferring all of Meritum Bank's assets to Alior Bank.

In June 2015, State-controlled PZU, Poland's largest insurer agreed to buy a 25.3-percent stake in Alior Bank. Currently, the PZU SA Group holds 31.91% of shares of the Alior Bank.

In 2017, Telekom Banking for individual customers was launched in Romania. It is a trade brand of Alior Bank and T-Mobile Romania. In 2024, Alior sold its assets in Romania to Patria Bank and ended services.

In 2018, the bank became a member of the Blockchain and New Technologies Chamber (Polish: Izba Blockchain i Nowych Technologii) and had been actively supporting initiatives aimed at developing blockchain technology in the country.

At the end of 2023. Alior Bank achieved record results. Net profit amounted to PLN 2.03 billion, an increase of PLN 1.35 billion compared to the 2022 result.[15] In April 2024, the General Meeting of Alior Bank decided to pay the first-ever dividend from the 2023 profit of PLN 577 million (PLN 4.42 per share).

In May 2024, the bank dismissed its President of the Management Board Grzegorz Olszewski and five other members of the management board, appointing Piotr Żabski as President of the management board in January 2025. Żabski was approved by the Polish Financial Supervision Authority a month later.

== See also ==
- List of banks
- List of banks in Poland
