= Polska Grupa Energetyczna =

Polish energy company

PGE Polska Grupa Energetyczna Spółka Akcyjna

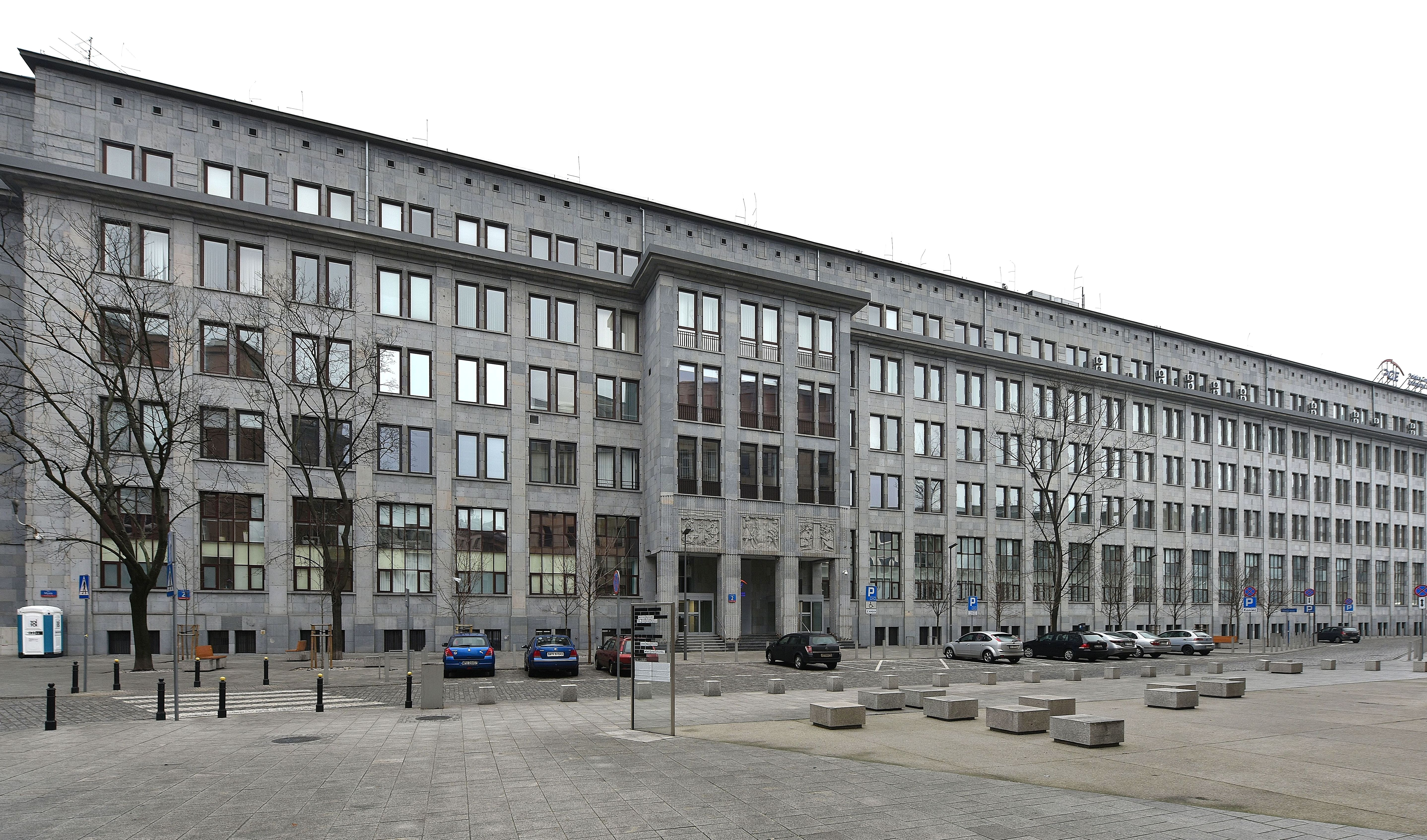
- The registered office of PGE at ul. Mysia 2 in Warsaw
- Type: State Owned
- Traded as: WSE: PGE; WIG30 component
- ISIN: PLPGER000010
- Industry: Electricity
- Founded: 2 August 1990
- Headquarters: Warsaw, Poland
- Key people: Wojciech Dąbrowski, President of the Management Board
- Products: Electrical power
- Revenue: $16.2 billion (2025)
- Operating income: $3.01 billion (2025)
- Net income: -$794.7 million (2025)
- Total assets: $25.18 billion (2025)
- Total equity: PLN 54.4 billion € 11.6 billion (2022)
- Number of employees: 41,227
- Website: www.gkpge.pl/en/

PGE Polska Grupa Energetyczna S.A. (PGE SA or PGE Group, the name can be translated as Polish Energy Group) is a state-owned public power company and the largest power producing company in Poland. PGE is listed on the Warsaw Stock Exchange and is a constituent of the WIG30 index.

The group is largely controlled by the Polish State Treasury who as of 9 July 2014 owns 58.39% of the public limited company. In addition to the activities of its core businesses of central and holdings companies in the generation and distribution of electricity, the group also trades electricity and other relevant products on the market. The total company revenue for 2015 was 28.542 billion złoty and the company made a net income loss of 3.032 billion złoty.

== History ==
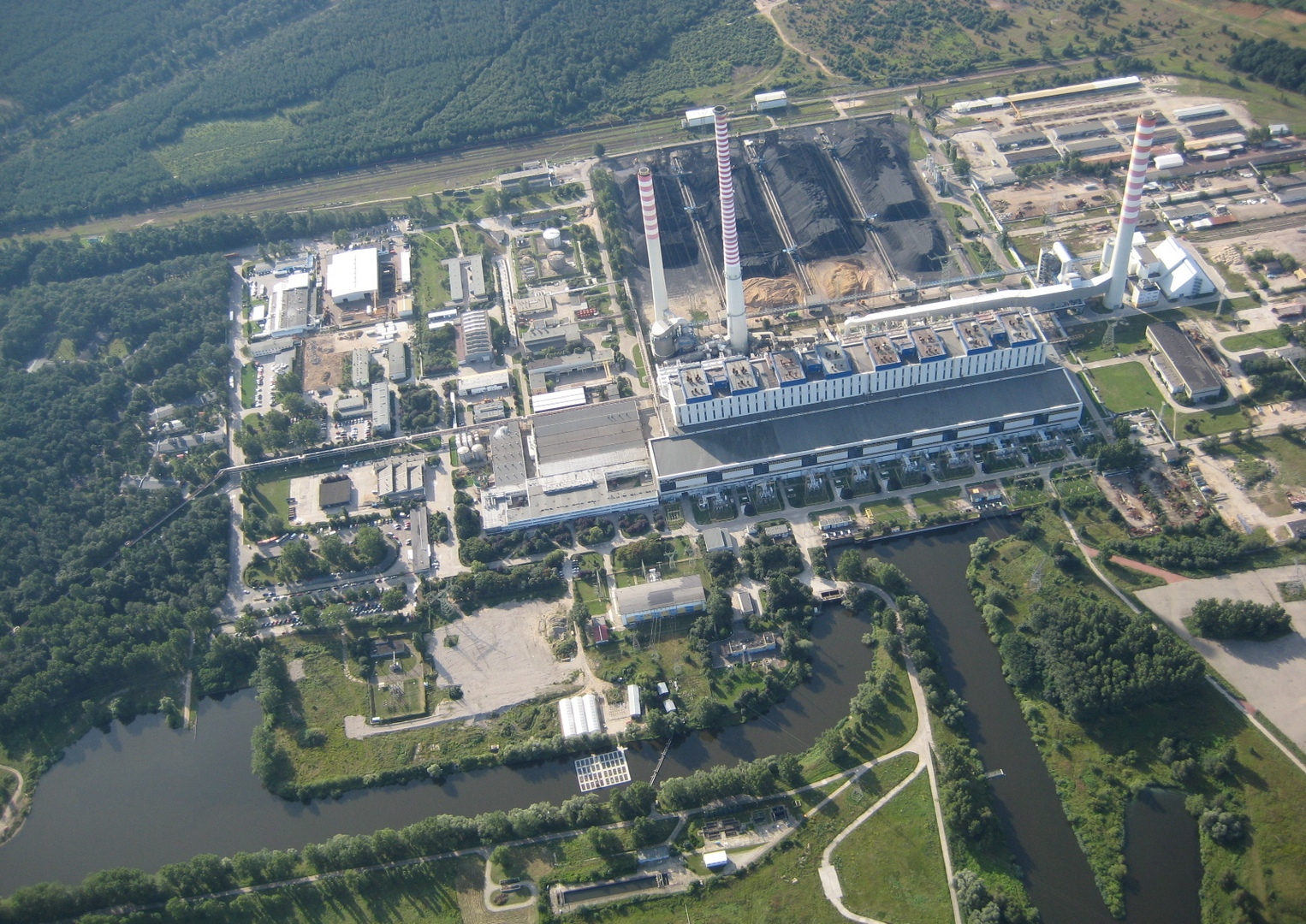
Dolna Odra Power Station

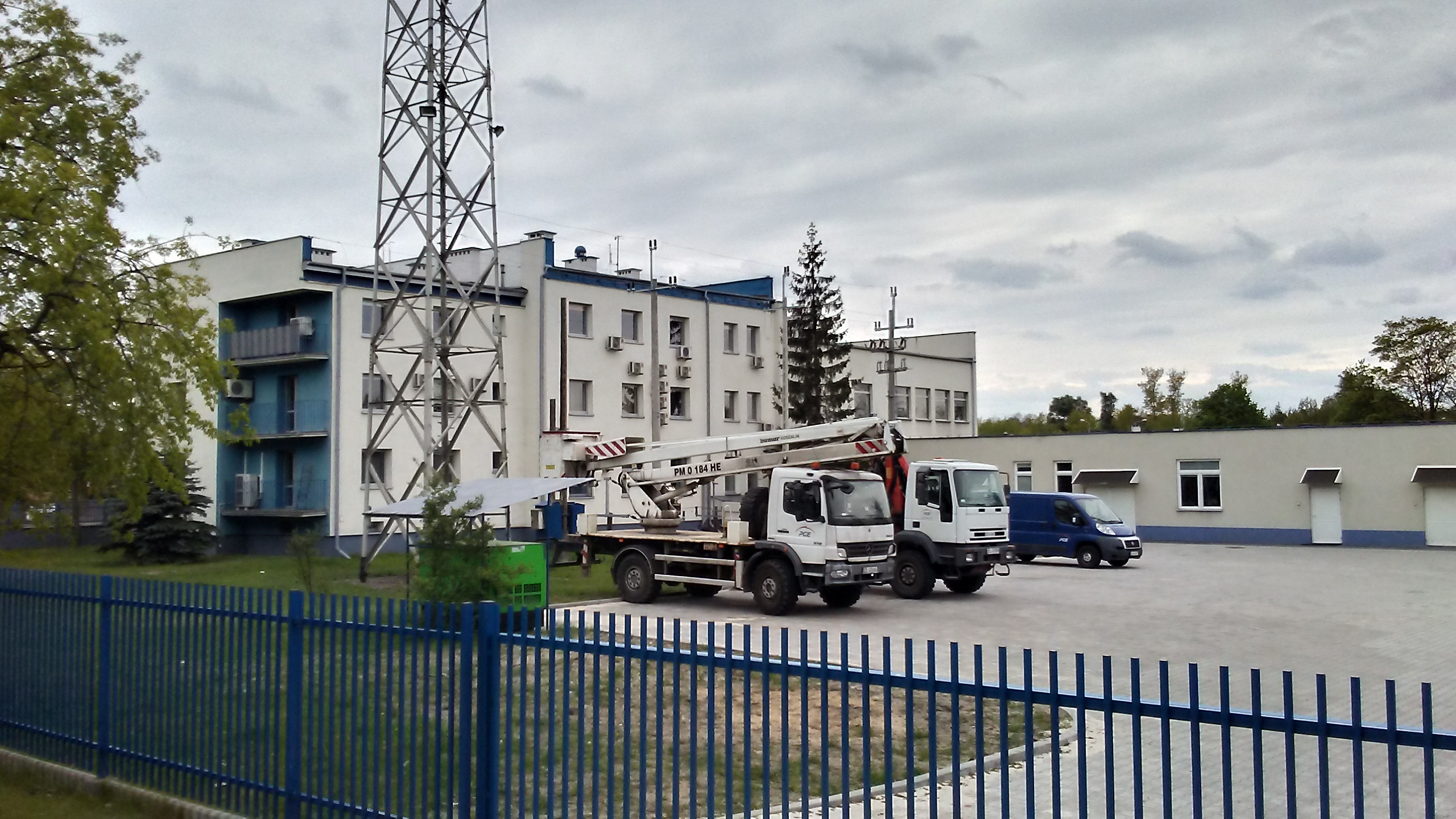
Branch of PGE in Tomaszów Mazowiecki (Łódź Voivodeship)

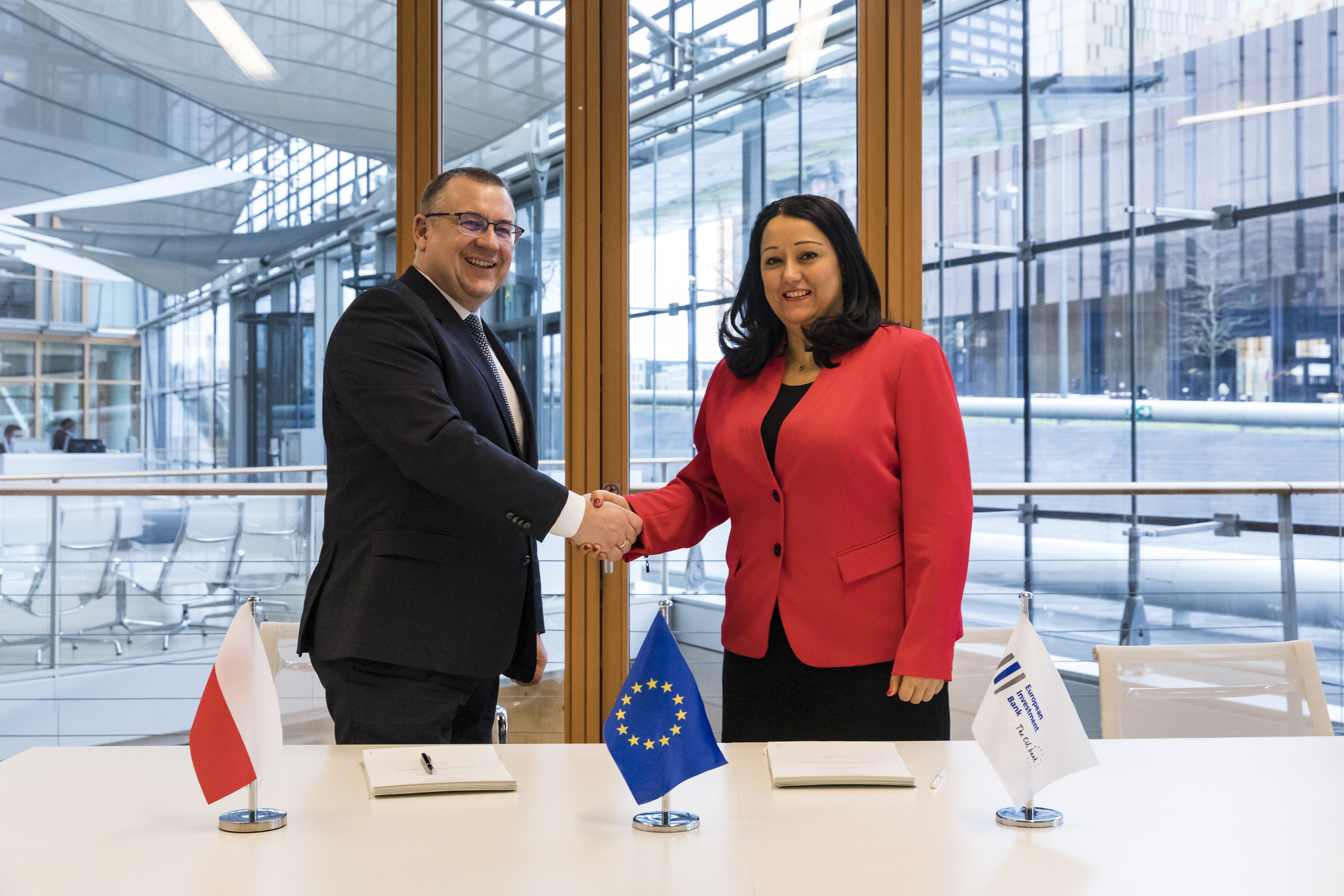
PGE Green Facility delegation from Poland meeting European Investment Bank Vice President Lilyana Pavlova, EIB funded a PGE project named PGE Green Facility.

The company was founded as Polskie Sieci Elektroenergetyczne S.A. (translates as Polish Electrical Power Lines Share Company) in 1990. In 2007 the Transmission System Operator division (PSE-Operator) was separated from the PSE S.A. group. On 9 May 2007 Polska Grupa Energetyczna was established by the merger of PSE, PGE Energia SA and BOT Górnictwo i Energetyka S.A. On 6 November 2009 PGE participated in its IPO in Warsaw Stock Exchange. On 19 March 2010 PGE was included in WIG20 index.

In October 2020, PGE Polska Grupa Energetyczna published a new strategy by 2030 with a perspective by 2050 and a transformation plan aimed at achieving climate neutrality of the Group in 2050. The key directions of the PGE Group's development will be offshore and onshore wind energy, photovoltaics, grid infrastructure, low-emission heating and energy services. The area of divestment and limitation of activity will include coal energy and hard coal trade.

In 2022 and 2023 it was reported that PGE was buying PKP Energetyka from CVC Capital Partners, CVC signed a preliminary agreement for the sale of PKP Energetyka in January 2023. On April 3, 2023 PGE Polish Energy Group acquired from the CVC Fund 100% of shares in PKPE Holding sp. z o.o. thus closing the purchase transaction of PKP Energetyka S.A. April 4, 2023 change of the company's name from PKP Energetyka to PGE Energetyka Kolejowa.

In 2024, the company announced plans to build Europe's largest energy storage facility in Żarnowiec, Poland. It will have a capacity of up to 263 MW and a minimum of 900 MWh. The project aims to support the balancing of PGE's land and offshore wind farms on the Baltic Sea and to improve the stability of the National Power System.

== Operations ==
The PGE Group operates two large lignite mines and more than 40 power stations, including the Bełchatów Power Station, the fifth-largest coal-fired power station in the world. Power stations are fuelled mainly by hard coal and lignite. The company consists of eight distribution system operator companies, eight electricity retail sales companies, an electricity wholesale company and enterprises operating in other industries (including the telecommunications). PGE holds a 38% market share in generation of electricity and an estimated 30% market share in supply in electricity for the year 2015. Projects of this company are, among possible other sources, funded by mBank (2020)

== Nuclear energy ==
On 15 January 2009, the company announced a plan to build two nuclear power stations in Poland. It also participated in the Visaginas Nuclear Power Plant project in Lithuania. In 2010, PGE established a special purpose entity called PGE EJ 1 to build and operate Poland's first commercially operational nuclear power plant, which was taken over by the State Treasury in 2021 and renamed as Polskie Elektrownie Jądrowe.

As of 2018 the Polish government was still considering whether to continue pursuing nuclear power in Poland, including resume construction of the Żarnowiec Nuclear Power Plant, whose construction has been stalled since 1990, but in May 2018 PGE decided to invest in offshore wind power instead.

== Sponsorship ==
Polska Grupa Energetyczna has held the naming rights for PGE Skra Bełchatów volleyball club since 1991.

The company bought the naming rights for the PGE Arena Gdańsk, a football stadium in Gdańsk, Poland, for 35 million złoty (about €8.5 million) for a duration of five years (2016–2021). The 2010 Speedway World Cup is named according to PGE. PGE also holds the naming rights for the Stadion Narodowy in Warsaw since 2015.
