= Enea SA =

Polish energy company

- Company type: Spółka Akcyjna
- Traded as: WSE: ENA; WIG30 Component
- Industry: Energy
- Founded: Poznań, Poland; 2 January 2003
- Headquarters: Poznań, Poland
- Key people: Paweł Majewski President of the Management Board
- Products: Electric power and heat
- Revenue: ▲PLN 30.128 billion € 6.4 billion (2022)
- Net income: PLN 119 million € 25 million (2022)
- Number of employees: 288 (Enea SA) (2015); 14,957 (Enea Group) (2015)
- Website: www.enea.pl

Enea is a Polish power industry company based in Poznań. Enea is the fourth largest energy group in Poland. As of December 2017, its share in the domestic electricity sales market was 13%.

Enea Group is the vice-leader in electricity production in Poland – in 2018 it generated 26.5 TWh.

== Business areas ==
The Enea Group was created from the merger of five power plants (Poznań, Bydgoszcz, Szczecin, Zielona Góra and Gorzów Wielkopolski), as well as from subsequent acquisitions (including Kozienice Power Plant and Połaniec Power Plant). The first name of the company was: Grupa Energetyczna Enea. On July 1, 2007, in accordance with the European Union directive, the distribution system operator was separated from the group – the company Enea Operator. The Group operates in the following voivodships: West Pomeranian Voivodeship, Lubusz Voivodeship, Kuyavian-Pomeranian Voivodeship, Greater Poland Voivodeship, (to a small extent) Lower Silesian Voivodeship, Pomeranian Voivodeship (five distribution areas of Enea Operator) and in Masovian Voivodeship (Enea Wytwarzanie), Świętokrzyskie Voivodeship (Enea Połaniec), Podlaskie Voivodeship (Enea Ciepło) and Lublin Voivodeship (LW Bogdanka).

Enel SpA, operates in sectors of the energy market:

1. coal mining (Lubelski Węgiel Bogdanka SA)
2. generation of electricity (Enea Wytwarzanie sp., whose main asset is Kozienice Power Plant)
3. distribution (Enea Operator sp.)
4. energy trade (Enel SpA – retail trade, Enea Trading sp. – wholesale trade)

Enea also conducts business in other areas of generation, distribution and sale of heat (MPEC Białystok, MEC Piła, PEC Oborniki) and lighting services (Enea Oświetlenie sp.).
