= Erste Bank Polska =

Polish bank

Erste Bank Polska SA

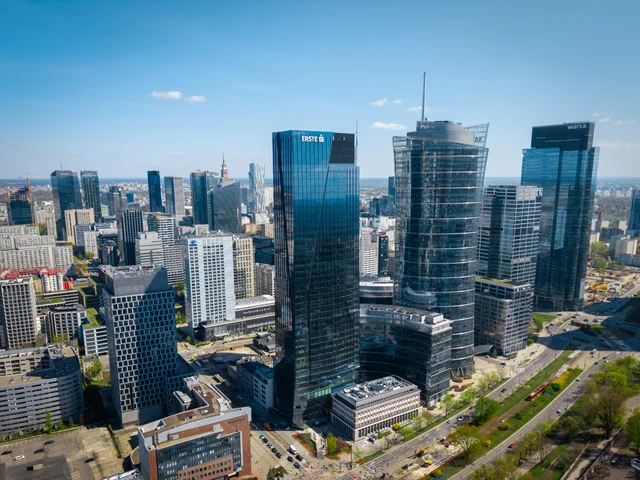
- Erste headquarters in Warsaw
- Type: Spółka Akcyjna
- Traded as: WSE: SPL; WIG30 component
- ISIN: PLBZ00000044
- Founded: March 7, 2001; 25 years ago
- Headquarters: Warsaw, Poland
- Key people: Michał Gajewski, Chairman
- Products: Banking products
- Total assets: PLN 276 billion (2023)
- Number of employees: 9,500
- Parent: Erste Group
- Website: www.erste.pl

Erste Bank Polska SA is a Polish universal bank based in Wrocław, Poznań and Warsaw. It is the third largest bank in Poland in terms of assets value and the number of outlets. It was formed in 2026 by rebranding of Santander Bank Polska following the purchase of a controlling stake by the Vienna-based Erste Group.

== History ==
In June 2025 Santander announced the sale of 49% of the bank to Erste Group. On 9 January 2026, Erste Group completed its purchase of a 49% controlling stake in Santander Bank Polska and a 50% stake in the asset manager Santander TFI from Santander Group. On 24 April 2026, the bank was re-branded as Erste Bank Polska.

== Capital Group ==
Erste Bank Polska Group encompasses companies whose core business is brokerage, asset management, investment fund management, leasing, factoring, bancassurance insurance services and private banking. Apart from Erste Bank Polska, its subsidiaries are:

- Santander Nieruchomości SA
- Santander Asset Management
- Santander Faktor sp. z o.o
- Santander Leasing SA
- Santander Inwestycje sp. z o.o
- Santander Allianz Towarzystwo Ubezpieczeń SA

== Shareholder structure ==
- 49.00% – Erste Group
- 9.70% – Banco Santander
- 5.23% – Allianz Polska Otwarty Fundusz Emerytalny
- 5.01% – Nationale-Nederlanden OFE
- 31.06% – Others

== Foundation ==
The mission of Erste Foundation established over 10 years ago (until 2001 it operated under the name of “Pomoc Ludziom”) is to invest in the development of talents and passion of children from economically disadvantaged families.

== See also ==
- List of banks in Poland
