= Stock Exchange Center =

Skyscraper office building in Warsaw, Poland

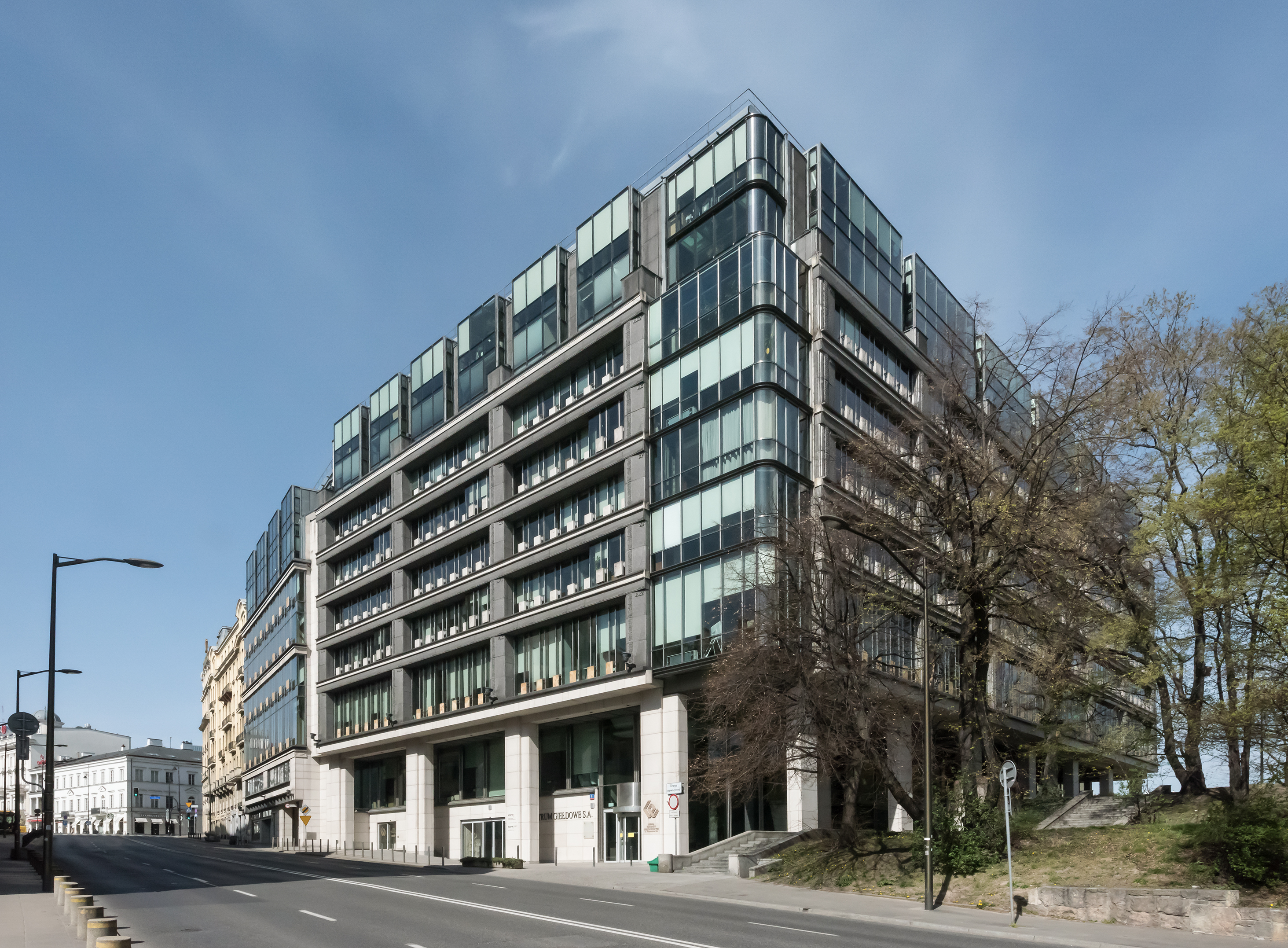
- The building in 2020.
- Interactive map of the Stock Exchange Center area

General information
- Type: Office building
- Location: Downtown, Warsaw, Poland, 4 Książęca Street
- Coordinates: 52°13′51.75″N 21°01′20.61″E
- Construction started: 1998
- Completed: 2000
- Owner: Warsaw Stock Exchange

Technical details
- Floor count: 10
- Floor area: 29,000 m^{2}

Design and construction
- Architects: Stanisław Fiszer; Andrzej M. Chołdzyński
- Developer: Warsaw Stock Exchange
- Main contractor: PORR Polska

The Stock Exchange Center (Polish: Centrum Giełdowe) is an office building in Warsaw, Poland, at 4 Książęca Street, within the South Downtown neighbourhood. It was opened in 2000, and houses the headquarters of the Warsaw Stock Exchange, National Securities Depository, and Power Exchange.

== History ==
The building was designed by Stanisław Fiszer and Andrzej M. Chołdzyński, and was constructed between 1998 and 2000, with PORR Polska as the main contractor. The building received numerous awards for its design, and was nominated to the European Union Prize for Contemporary Architecture.

== Characteristics ==
The office building, placed at 4 Książęca Street at the corner with Lorentza Street, has 10 storeys and the floor area of 29,000 m^{2} It houses the headquarters of the Warsaw Stock Exchange, National Securities Depository, and Power Exchange, being managed by the first company on said list.
