= WIG30 =

Blue chip stock market index

- Foundation: 23 September 2013
- Operator: Stooq
- Exchanges: Warsaw Stock Exchange
- Constituents: 30
- Type: Large cap
- Weighting method: Capitalization-weighted
- Related indices: WIG20, mWIG40, sWIG80
- Website: WIG homepage

The WIG30 is a capitalization-weighted stock market index of the thirty major Polish blue chip companies traded on the Warsaw Stock Exchange (WSE). The WIG30 index has been published since 23 September, 2013, based on the value of the portfolio of shares of the 30 largest and most liquid companies on the WSE Main Market. The base value of the index was established on December 28, 2012, and amounted to 2,582.98 points. The index is published alongside WIG20 index.

WIG30 is a price return index, which means that when calculating it, only the prices of transactions concluded in it are taken into account, and no dividend income is included. The WIG30 index may not include more than 7 companies from one exchange sector, and the share of one company is limited to 10% in the index.

It is computed daily between 09:00 and 17:10 Hours CET.

== Components ==
The list of the WIG30 companies as of 28 April 2026:

Logo	Company	Sector	Ticker	Index weighting (%)	Seat	Founded	Employees
	PKN Orlen	Petroleum	PKN	11,276	Płock	1999	21,109 (2021)
	PKO Bank Polski	Financial Services	PKO	10,196	Warsaw	1919	25,800 (2020)
	Bank Pekao	Financial Services	PEO	8,207	Warsaw	1929	13,497 (2021)
	KGHM Polska Miedź	Mining	KGH	8,130	Lubin	1961	33,935 (2020)
	PZU	Insurance	PZU	7,290	Warsaw	1803	40,805 (2020)
	LPP	Textile	LPP	5,672	Gdańsk	1991	25,000 (2021)
	Erste Bank Polska	Financial Services	EBP	5,260	Warsaw	2001	10,867 (2019)
	Allegro	E-commerce	ALE	5,186	Poznań	1999	4,848 (2021)
	CD Projekt	Technology	CDR	3,892	Warsaw	1994	1,111 (2019)
	Dino	Retail	DNP	3,076	Krotoszyn	1999	16,530 (2018)
	mBank	Financial Services	MBK	2,973	Warsaw	1986	5,100 (2020)
	Żabka	Retail	ZAB	2,511	Warsaw	1998	
	Benefit Systems	Employee Benefits	BFT	2,354	Warsaw	2001	
	Bank Millennium	Financial Services	MIL	2,191	Warsaw	1989	7,079 (2021)
	Alior Bank	Financial Services	ALR	2,178	Warsaw	2008	8,143 (2019)
	Grupa Kęty	Basic Materials	KTY	2,150	Kęty	1953	5,322 (2021)
	Asseco Poland	Technology	ACP	1,978	Rzeszów	1991	32,400 (2023)
	Tauron	Utilities	TPE	1,970	Katowice	2006	25,572 (2020)
	Orange Polska	Telecommunication	OPL	1,825	Warsaw	1991	13,222 (2019)
	PGE	Utilities	PGE	1,819	Warsaw	1990	41,629 (2020)
	Budimex	Construction	BDX	1,690	Warsaw	1968	7,022 (2022)
	Kruk (Polish company)	Debt collection	KRU	1,660	Wrocław	1998	3,267 (2022)
	XTB	Financial Services	XTB	1,591	Warsaw	2004	
	Pepco	Retail	PCO	1,387	Poznań	1999	26,000 (2021)
	Enea	Utilities	ENA	1,098	Poznań	2003	17,291 (2019)
	Modivo	Textile	MDV	0,810	Polkowice	1999	13,220 (2021)
	Cyfrowy Polsat	Telecommunication	CPS	0,691	Warsaw	1999	7,400 (2020)
	Rainbow Tours	Tourism	RBW	0,347	Łódź	1990	
	JSW	Mining	JSW	0,305	Jastrzębie-Zdrój	1993	31,916 (2021)
	Synektik	Healthcare	SNT	0,288	Warsaw	2001	

== Former companies ==
The following companies have been removed from the WIG30 index:

- Energa (Utilities)
- ING Bank Śląski (Financial Services)
- Globe Trade Centre (Real Estate)
- Grupa Lotos (Basic Materials)
- Kernel Holding (Basic Materials)
- PGNiG (Utilities)
- PKP Cargo (Logistics)
- Play (Telecommunication)

== See also ==
- Economy of Poland
- Warsaw Stock Exchange
- List of Polish companies
- List of largest Polish companies
