= Dino Polska =

Polish supermarket chain

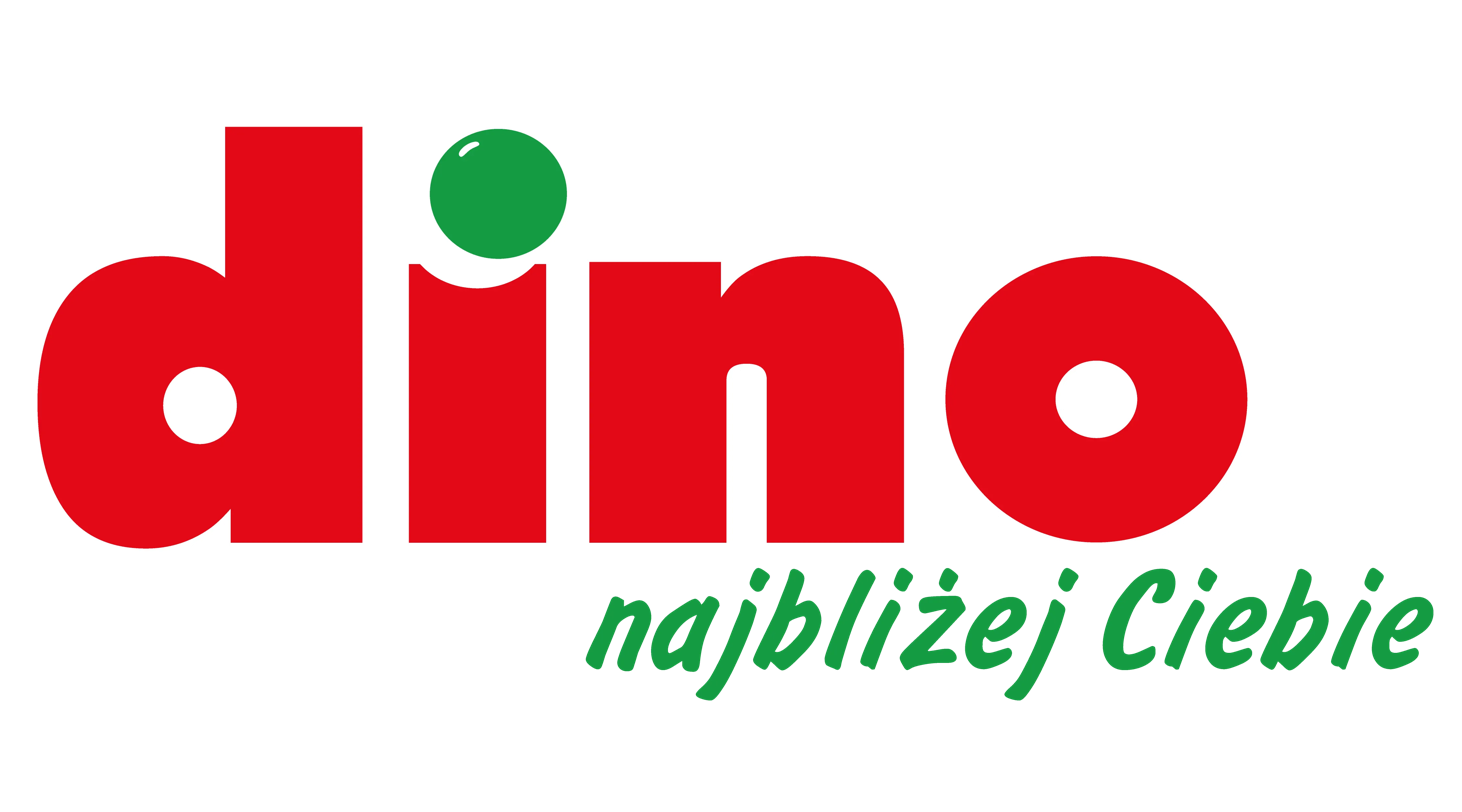
- Type: Joint-stock company
- Traded as: WSE: DNP; WIG30 component
- Industry: Retail
- Founded: 1999; 27 years ago
- Founders: Tomasz Biernacki
- Headquarters: Krotoszyn, Poland
- Number of locations: 3,176 stores (2026)
- Area served: Poland
- Key people: Tomasz Biernacki (Chairman of the supervisory board)
- Revenue: $7.36 billion (2025)
- Operating income: ▲1.9 billion PLN (2024)
- Net income: $378.1 million (2025)
- Total assets: $3.16 billion (2025)
- Total equity: ▲7.1 billion PLN (2024)
- Owner: Tomasz Biernacki (51.2%; actual beneficiary exercising control)
- Number of employees: ▲49.9 thousand (2024)
- Website: marketdino.pl

Dino Polska S.A. is a Polish retail company that operates grocery stores throughout Poland. Dino is a publicly-traded company listed at Warsaw Stock Exchange. As of the end of 2024, the Dino Group operated 2,688 stores with a total sales area of 1,061,200 m^{2} (262.2 acres), employed 49,900 people, and reported revenues of PLN 29.3 billion. At the same time, 92% of its stores were equipped with photovoltaic installations, which had a total installed capacity of 98.9 MW, and a total of 86.6 GWh of solar energy was procured.

Dino supermarkets are generally located in medium and small-sized towns as well as on the peripheries of larger cities. The retail chain was founded in 1999 by Tomasz Biernacki and started in western Poland, but has since expanded across the entire country. In 2022, the Subcarpathian Voivodeship became the last of Poland's voivodeships to open a Dino store and Dino is now present in every voivodeship.

== Structure ==
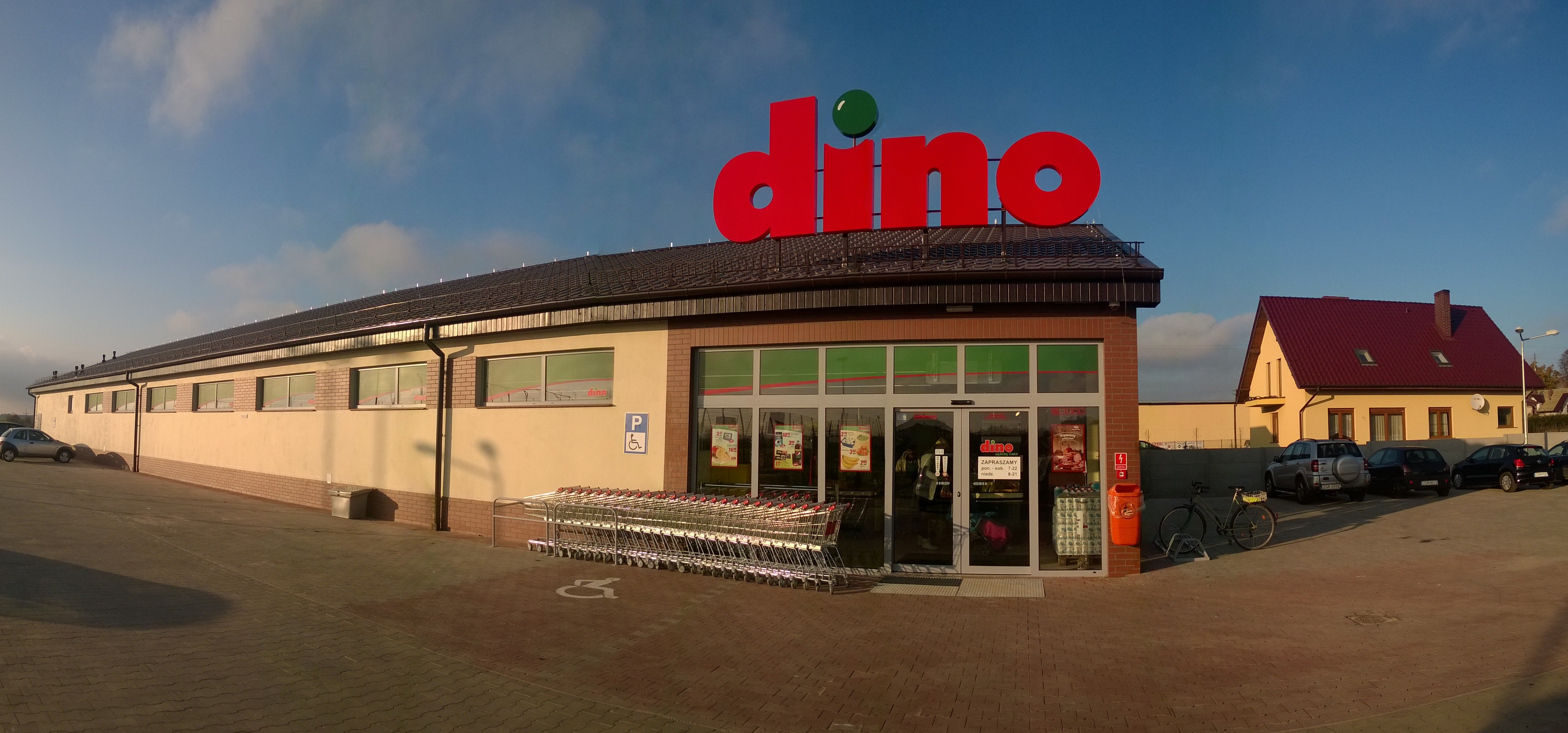
One of Dino Polska's nationwide network of convenience stores, here in Moryń

The Dino Polska logistics network is based on three distribution centres located in: Krotoszyn, Jastrowie, Piotrków Trybunalski and Rzeszotory. Due to the expansion of the retail chain, Tomasz Biernacki set up the private limited company Dino Polska Sp. z o.o., whom over the course of the next three years sold all Dino stores to. The continued expansion of the company forced its transformation into a joint-stock company.

Dino Polska stores offer their customers around five thousand different articles, with each store including a meat counter, selling meat, prosciutto and a variety of prepared meat types mainly supplied by Agro-Rydzyna. Dino Polska is the owner of the Agro-Rydzyna meat plant. Since 2010, Dino Polska is the sole distributor of meat and ham products under this brand, buying shares in the company since 2003.

In June 2010, Enterprise Investors, an investment fund, bought 49% of the shares in the company for 200 million zlotys. Since its relations with Enterprise Investors, the retail chain began to markedly expand, from 111 stores at the end of 2010 to 628 stores by the end of December 2016. In April 2017, Enterprise Investors allocated all of its assets onto the Warsaw Stock Exchange. Dino Polska had 1056 stores as of June 2019. In 2023, it opened 250 new stores; the network numbered 2,406 stores at the end of 2023.

Growth of Dino since 2008
Year	Stores	Revenue (million zl)	Net income (million zl)	Stock price (zl)
2008	81			
2009	90			
2010	111			
2011	154			
2012	234			
2013	324			
2014	410	2,108	66	
2015	511	2,590	122	
2016	628	3,321	151	
2017	775	4,463	214	7.88
2018	977	5,839	308	9.59
2019	1,218	7,647	411	14.40
2020	1,473	10,126	644	28.94
2021	1,815	13,362	805	36.73
2022	2,156	19,802	1,132	37.53
2023	2,406	25,666	1,405	46.07
2024	2,688	29,274	1,505	38.98
2025	3,033			41.35

== Gallery ==
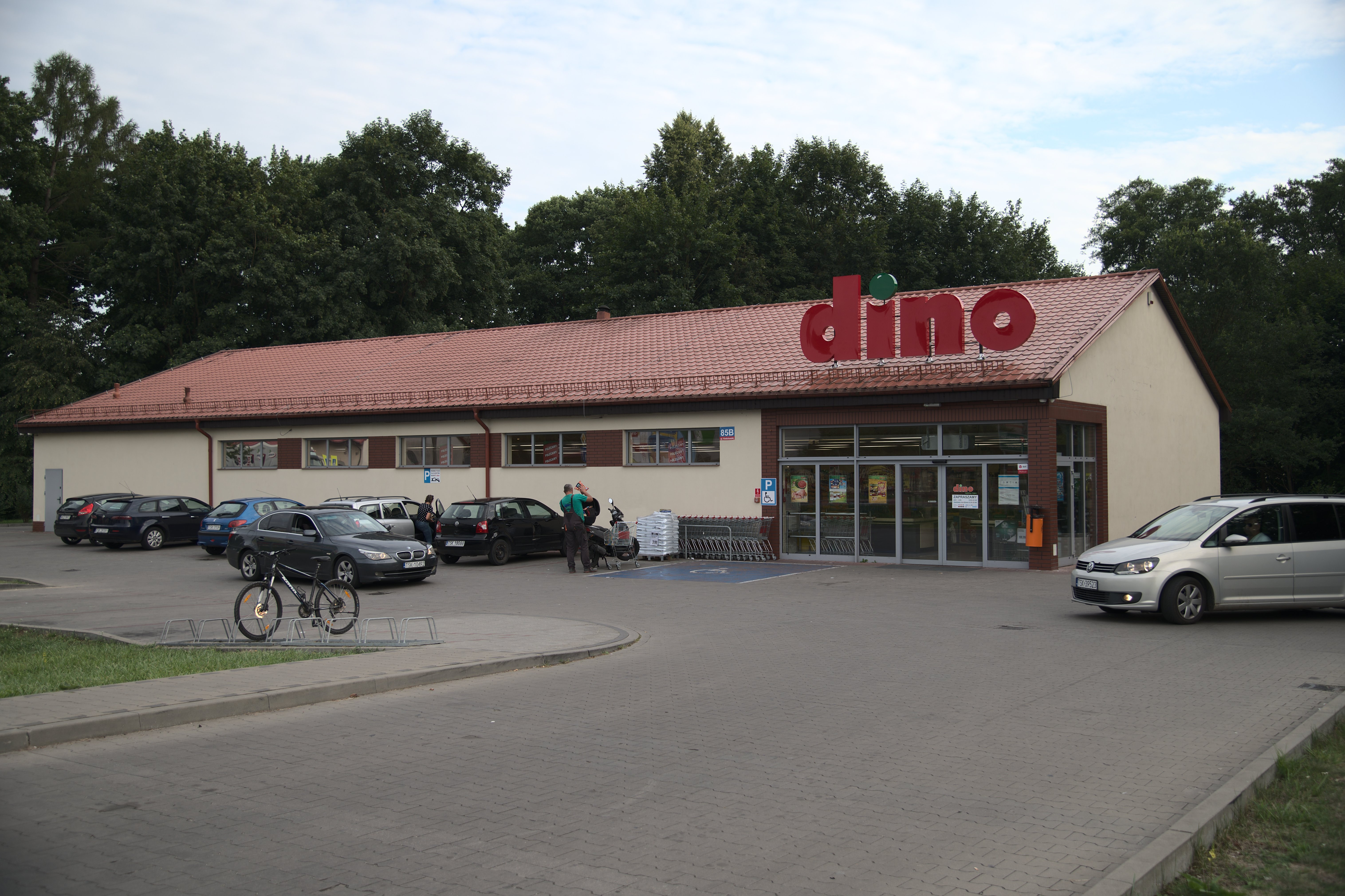
A Dino store in Bliżyn

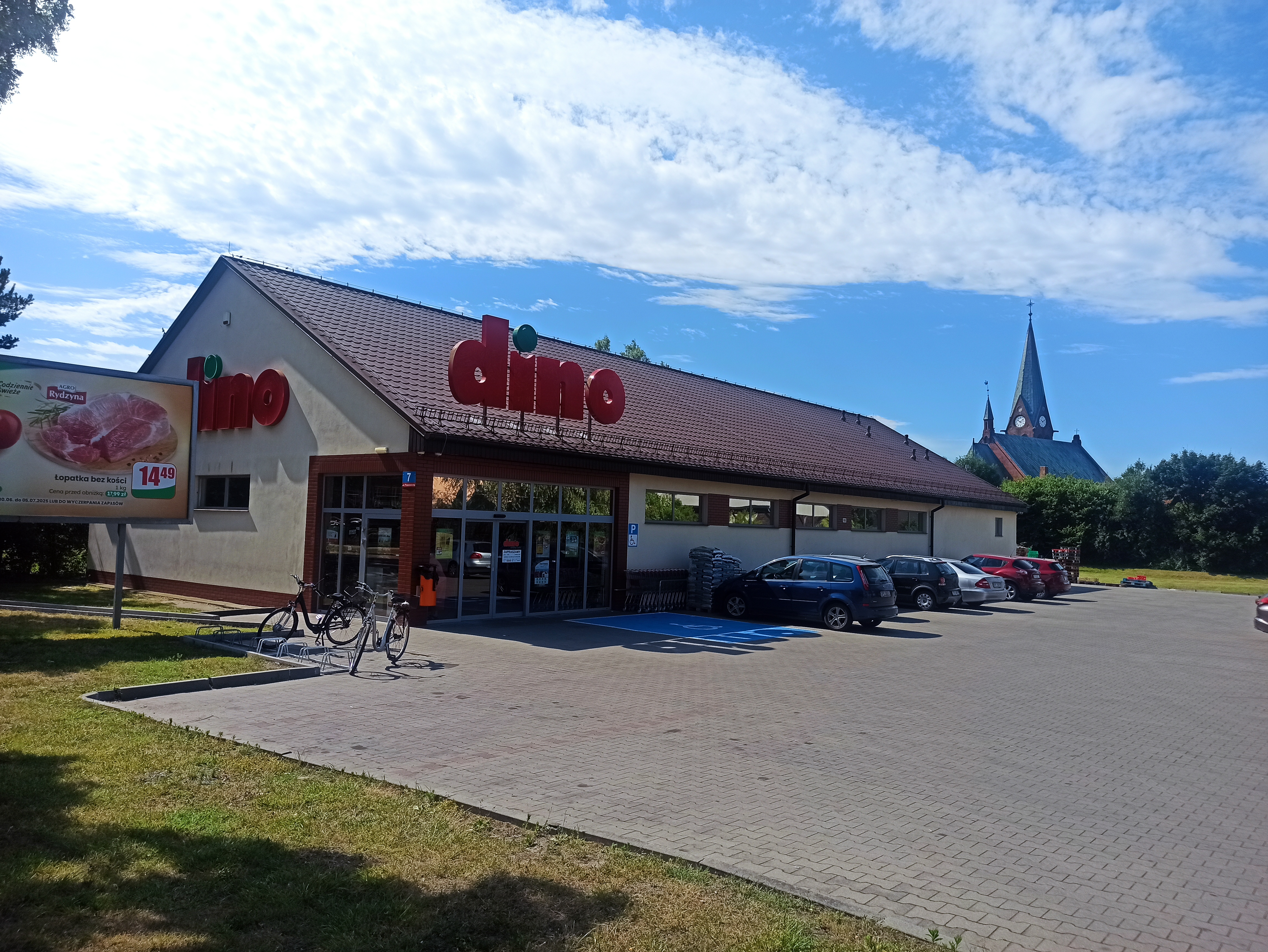
A Dino store in Popielów

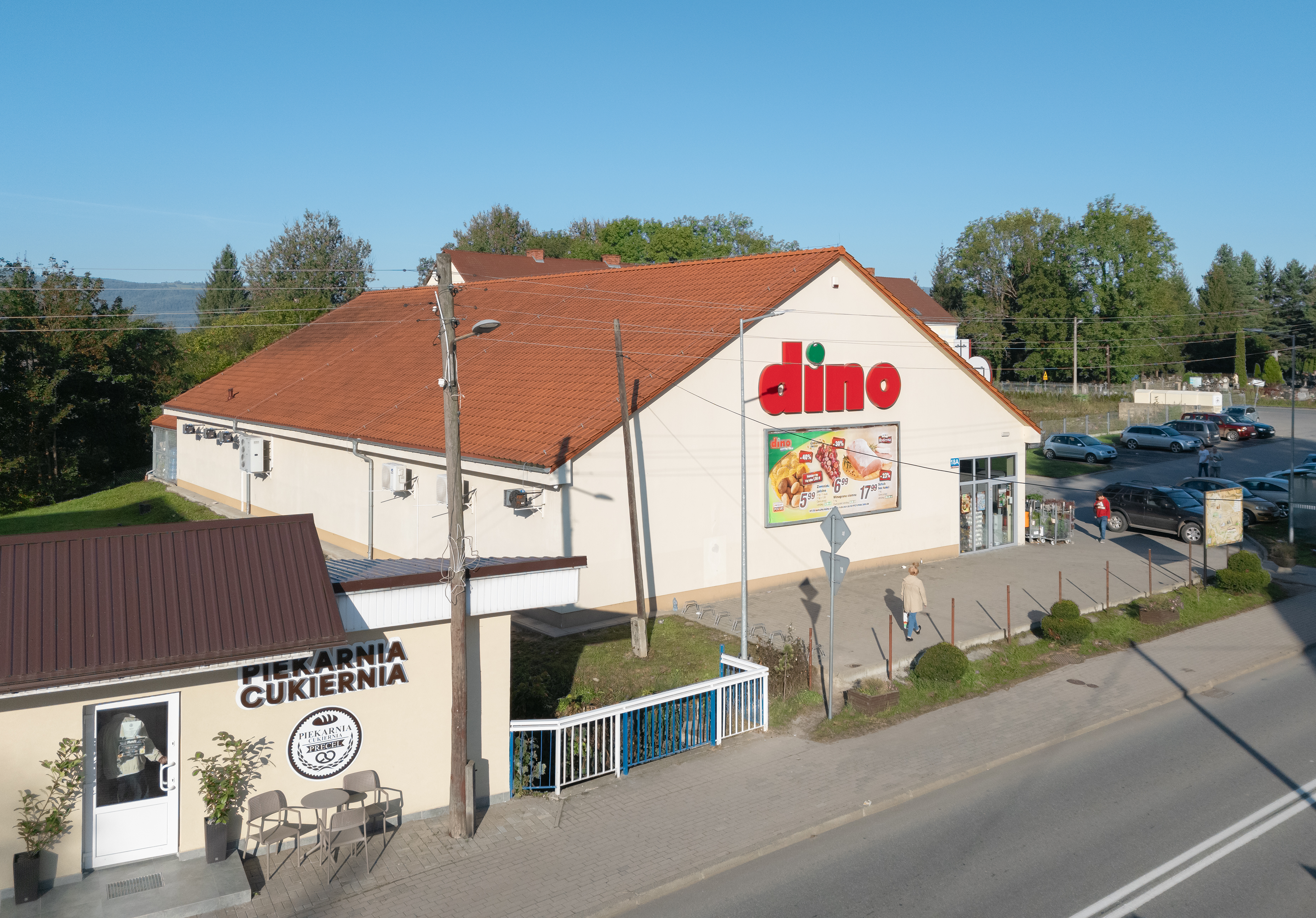
A Dino store in Domaszków

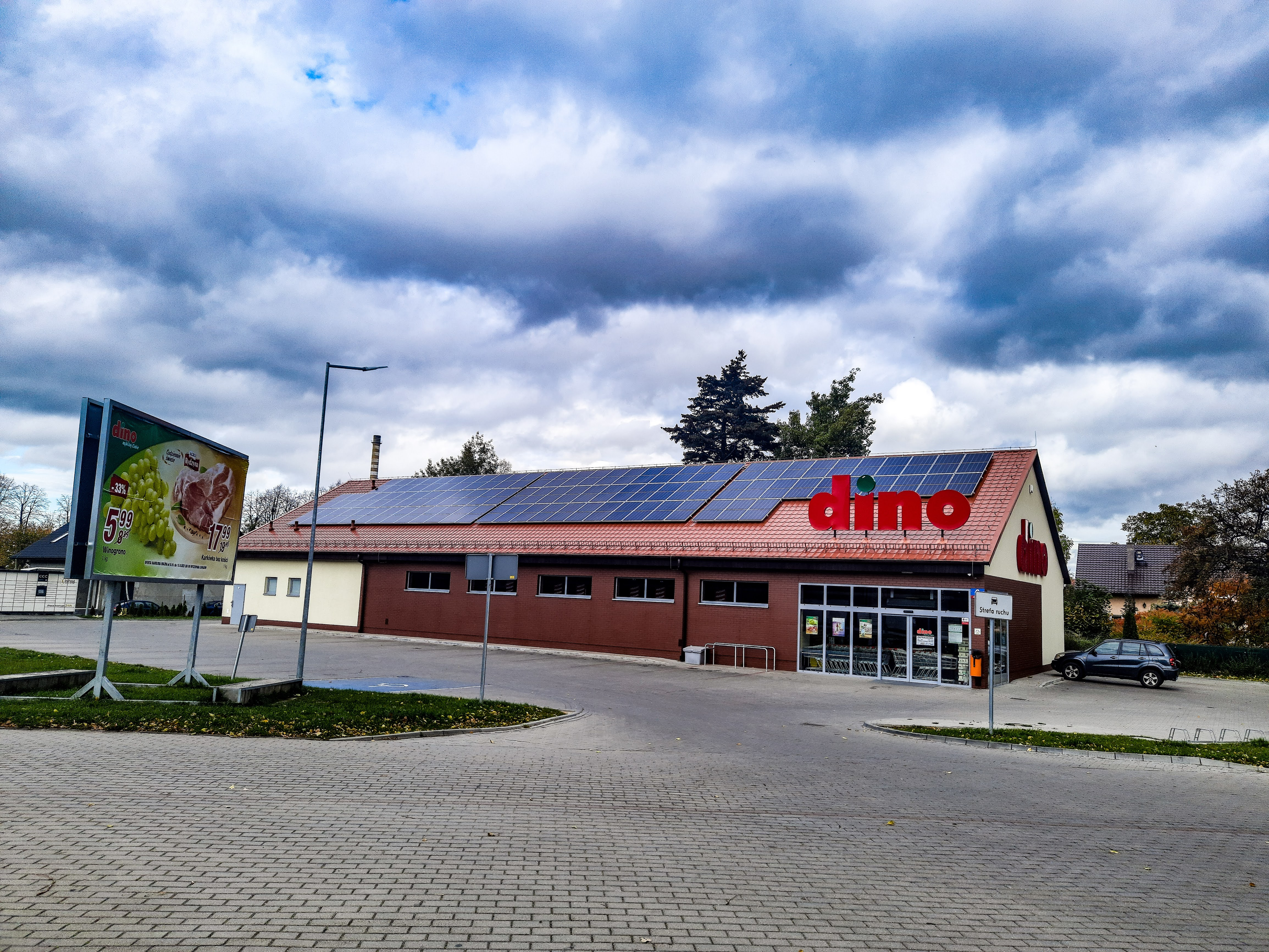
A Dino store in Bielawa

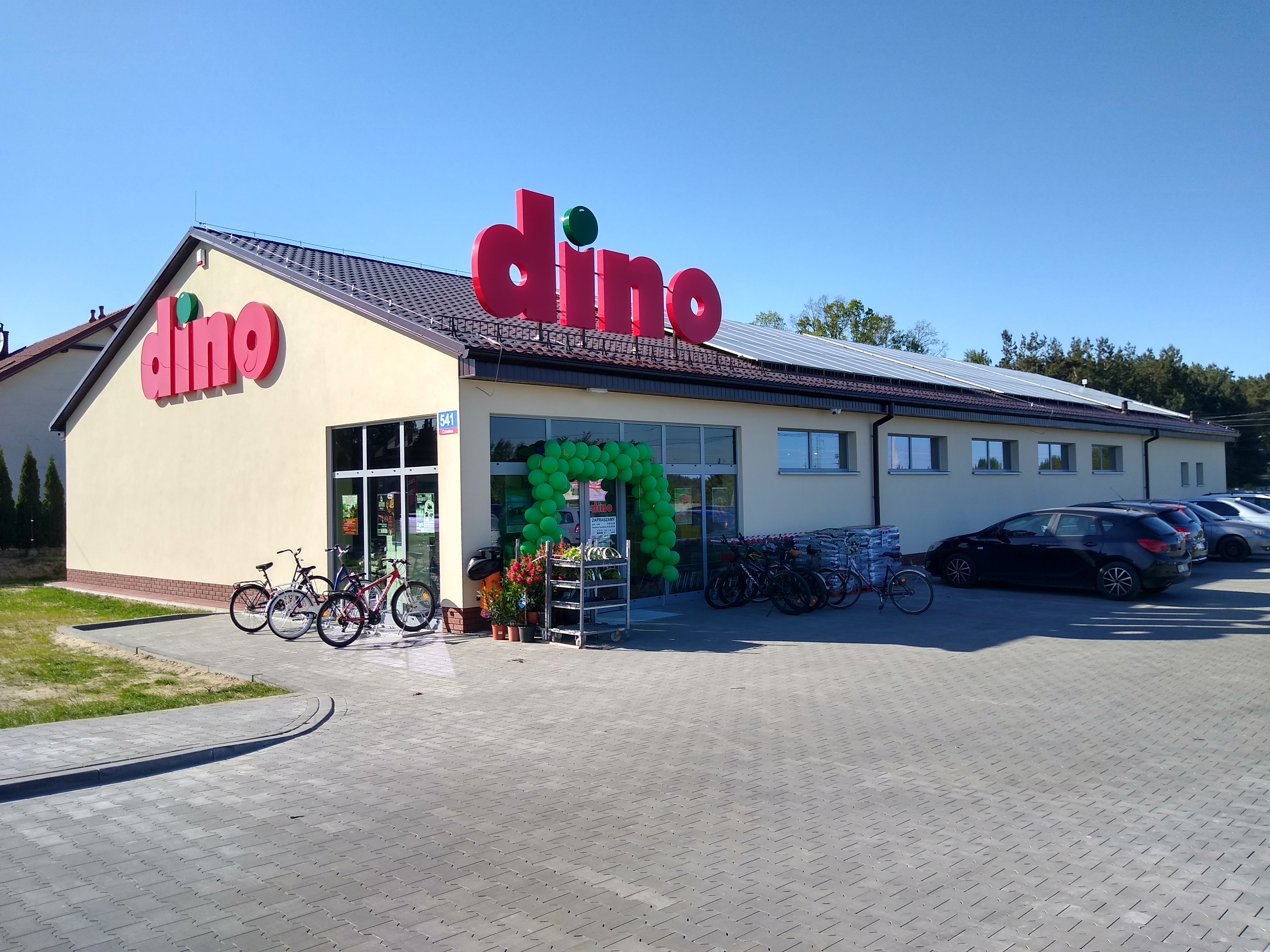
A Dino store in Cmolas

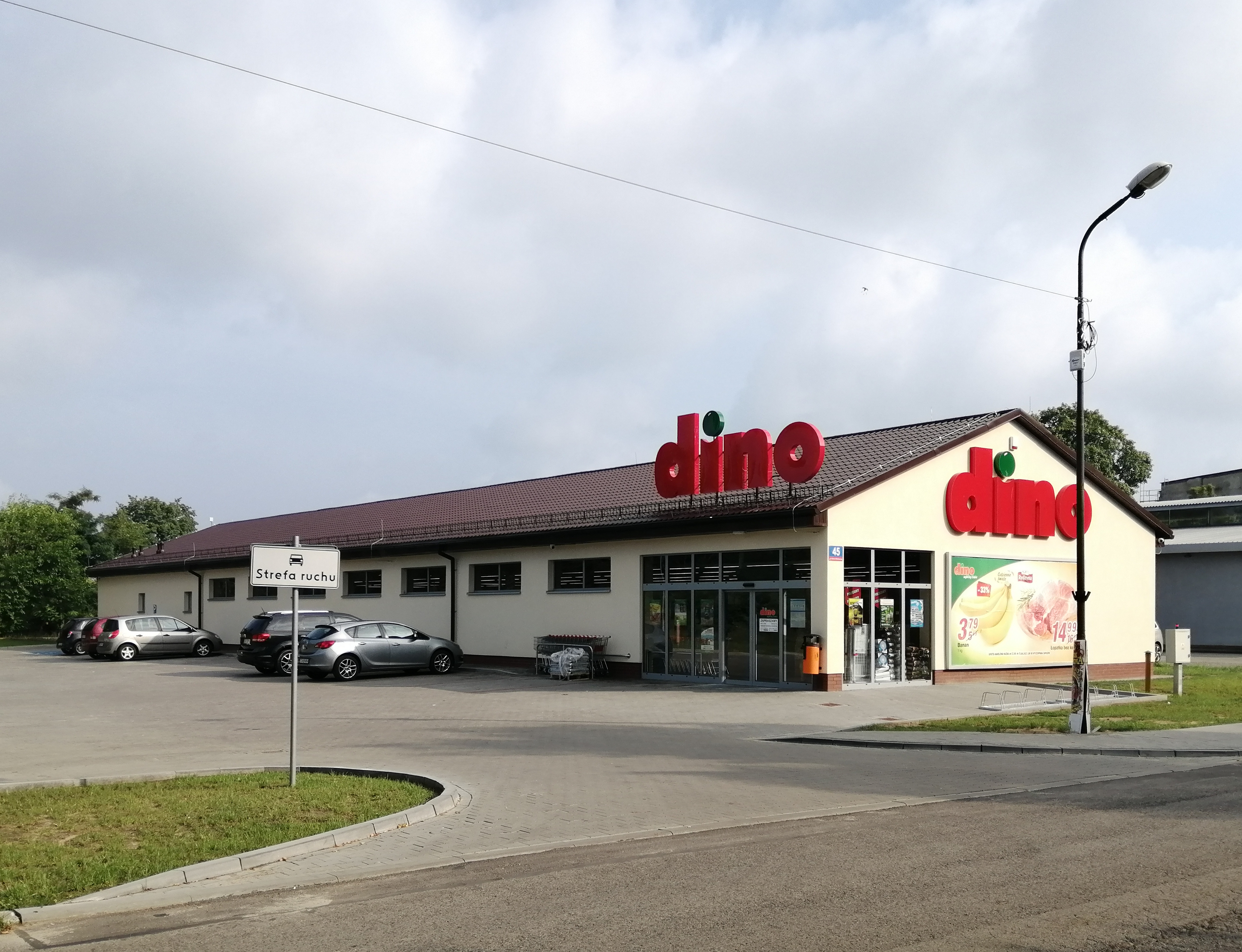
A Dino store in Tarnowskie Góry

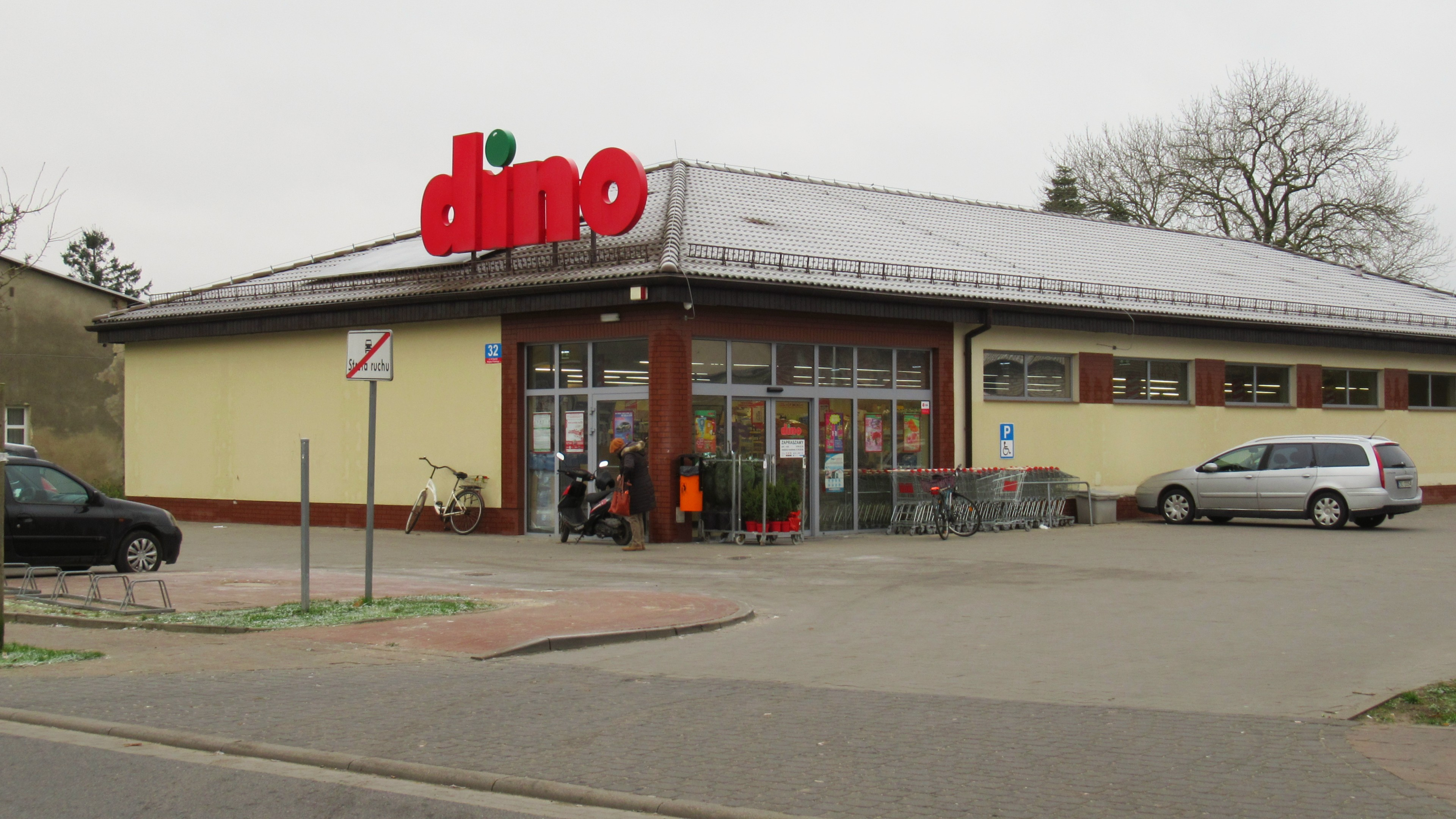
A Dino store in Gościno

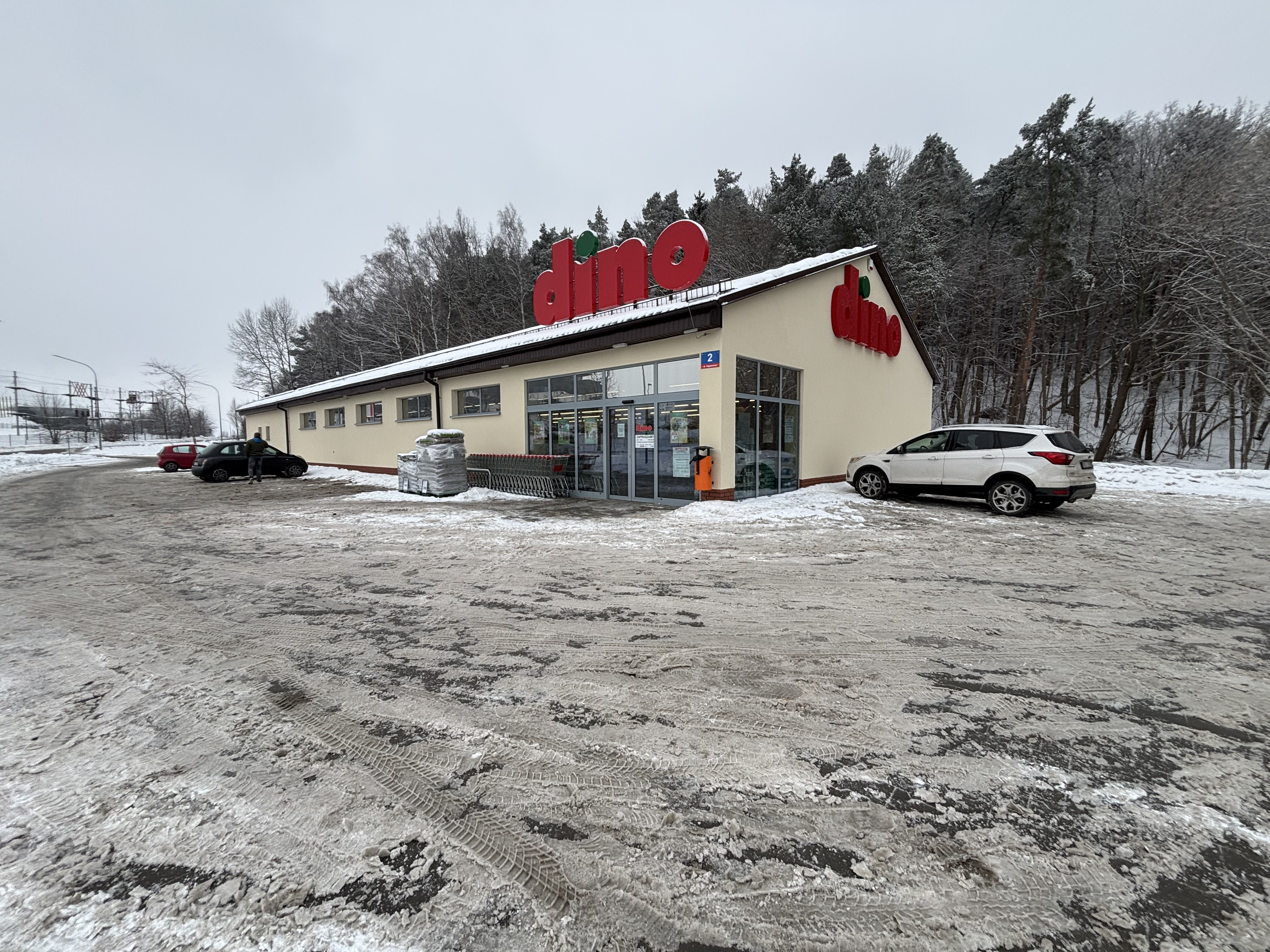
A Dino store in Lidzbark Warmiński

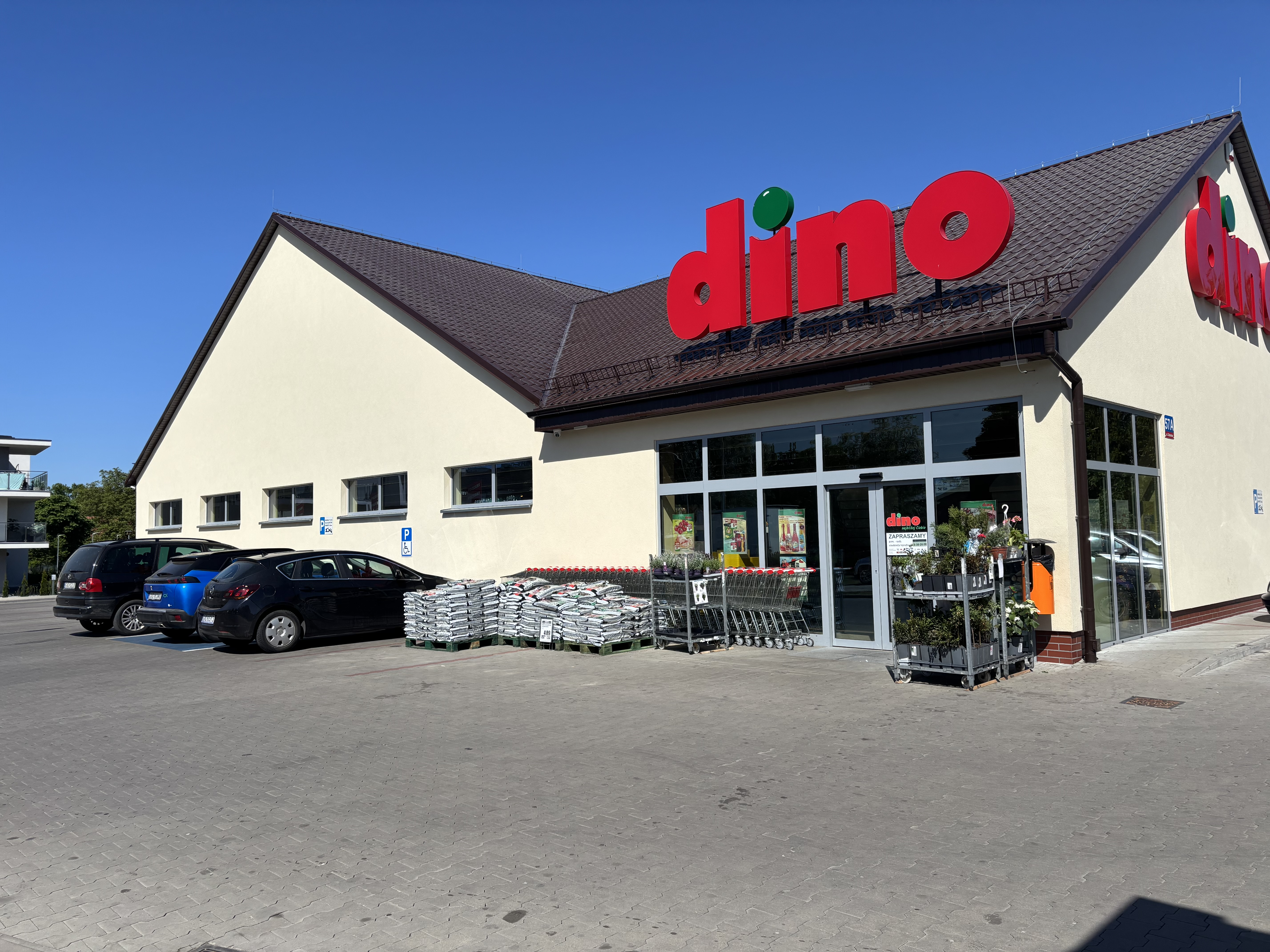
A Dino store in Sztutowo

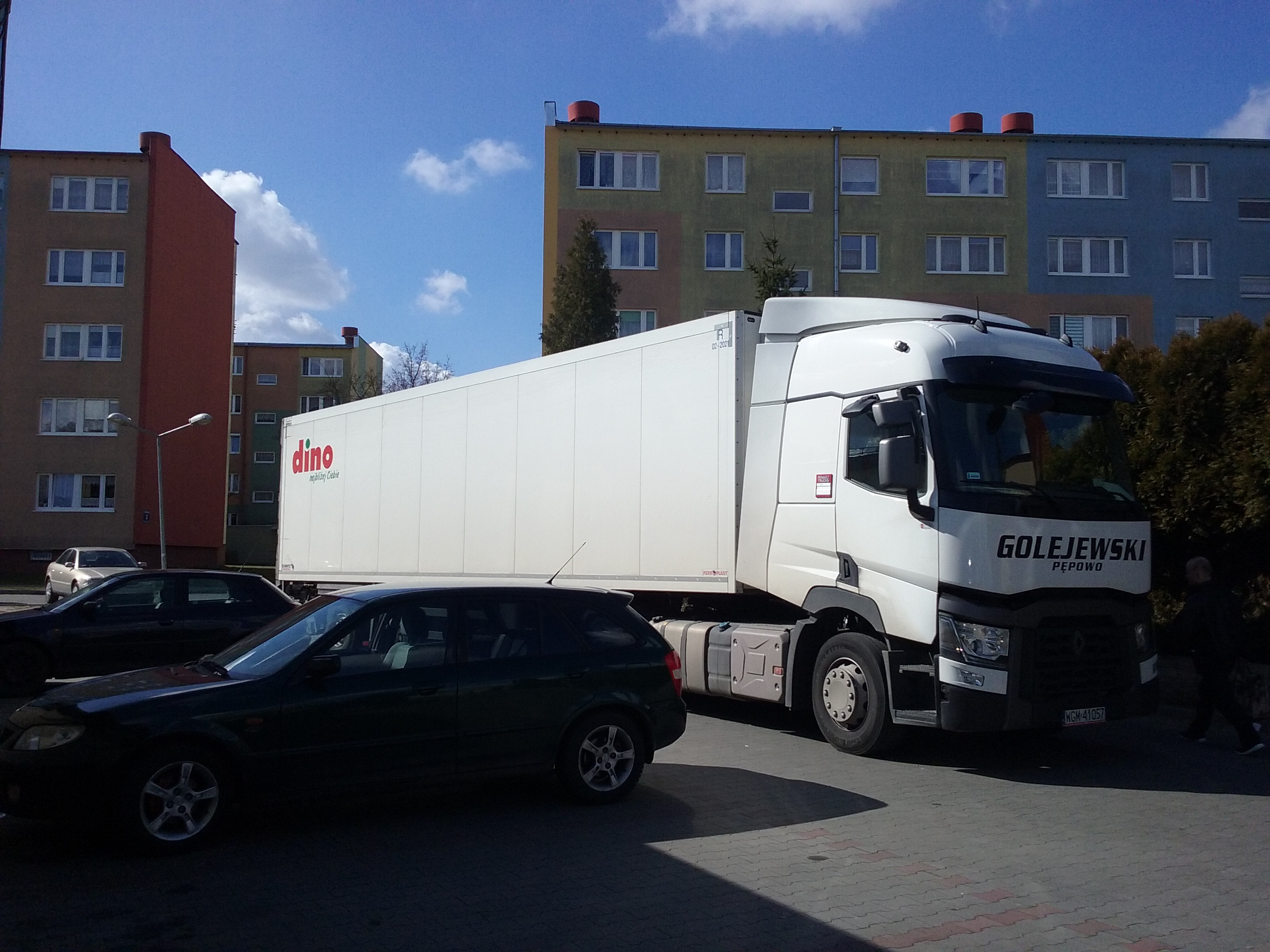
A Dino supply truck in Tomaszów Mazowiecki

== Bibliography ==
- Głuchowski, Piotr (6 July 2026). "Dzień dobry, czy zastałem szefa?". Duży Format, magazyn reporterów Gazety Wyborczej: 5–8.
