= Warsaw Stock Exchange =

Stock exchange in Warsaw, Poland

- Giełda Papierów Wartościowych w Warszawie

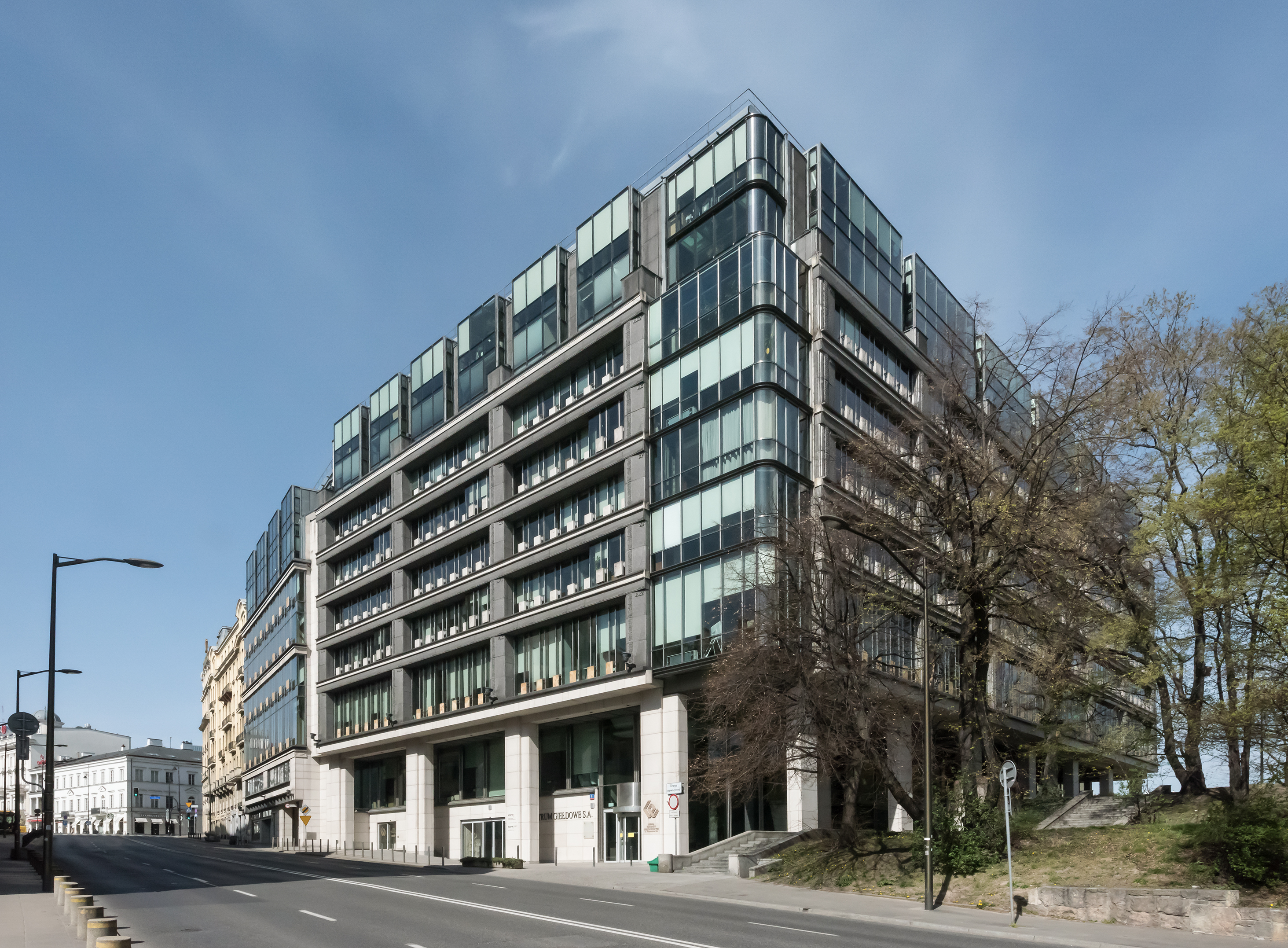
- The company headquarters in the Stock Exchange Center in Warsaw
- Type: Stock exchange
- Location: Warsaw, Poland
- Coordinates: 52°13′49.0″N 21°1′24.5″E
- Founded: May 12, 1817; 209 years ago April 12, 1991; 35 years ago (in current form)
- Owner: Ministry of State Treasury and private investors
- Key people: Tomasz Bardziłowski (President of the Management Board)
- Currency: PLN
- No. of listings: 402 (2026)
- Market cap: USD 796.5 billion (2026)
- Indices: WIG; WIG20; WIG30
- Website: gpw.pl

The Warsaw Stock Exchange (WSE) (Polish: Giełda Papierów Wartościowych w Warszawie (GPW)) is a stock exchange in Warsaw, Poland. Founded in 1817, it was located in the Saxon Palace until 1877 when it was moved to the Exchange Building at the Saxon Garden. Currently, it is located at ul. Książęca 4 in the Śródmieście District of Warsaw in the Exchange Center Building (Polish: Centrum Giełdowe) opened in 2000. As of September 2026, there are 402 companies, including 19 foreign ones, quoted on the stock exchange whose market capitalization amounts to PLN 3.03 trillion (USD 796.5 billion), making it the largest stock exchange in Central and Eastern Europe. The most important stock market indices of the Warsaw Stock Exchange are WIG20, WIG30, MWIG40 and SWIG80. Trading at Warsaw runs from 08:30 to 17:00 with closing auction from 17:00-17:05.

As of early 2025, the WSE was majority-owned by the Polish government. It is a member of the Federation of European Securities Exchanges. On 17 December 2013, the WSE also joined the United Nations Sustainable Stock Exchanges (SSE) initiative.

On 23 August 2023, the company formed EuroCTP as a joint venture with 13 other bourses, in an effort to provide a consolidated tape for the European Union, as part of the Capital Markets Union proposed by the European Commission.

== History ==
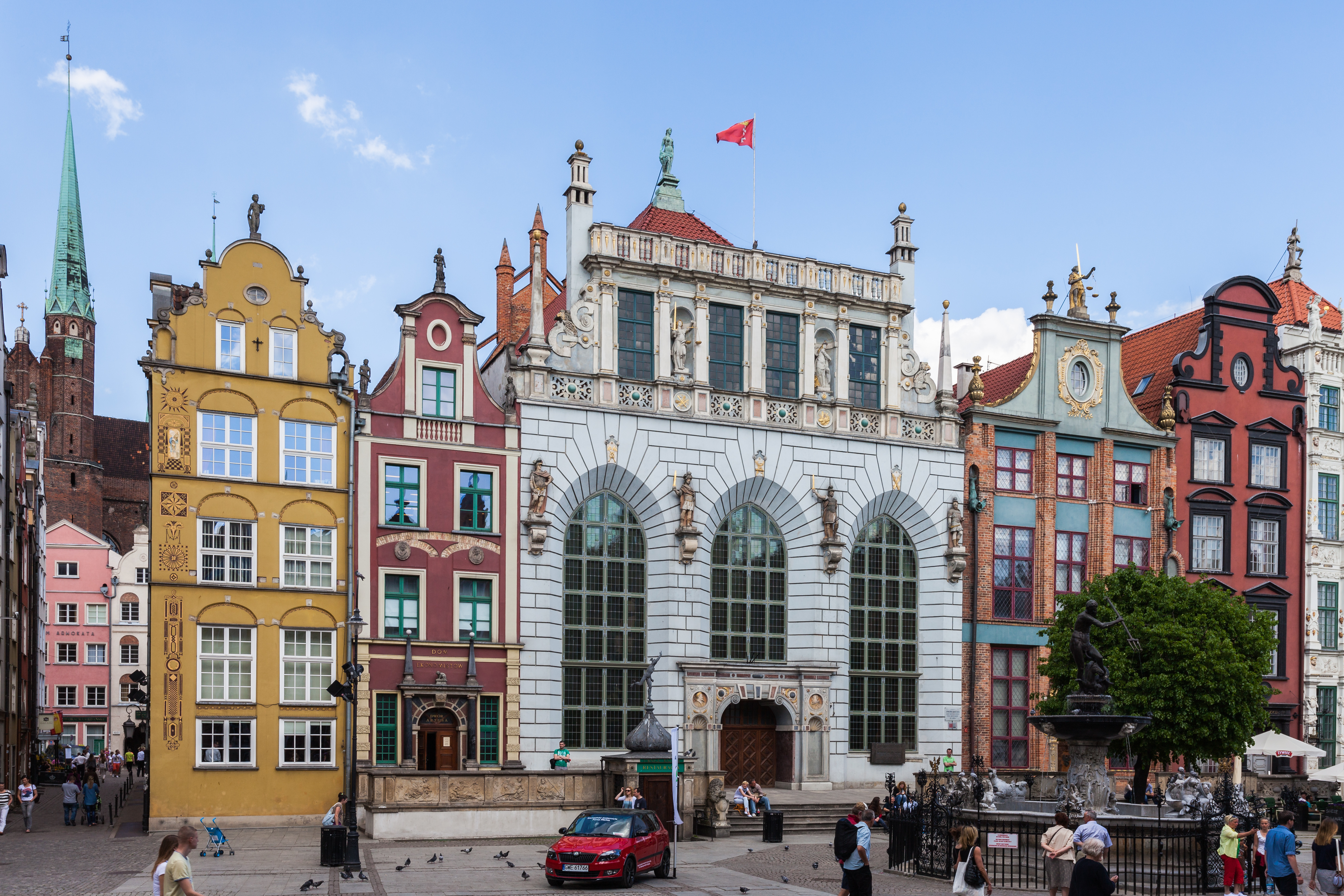
Artus Court in Gdańsk was home to the oldest Polish mercantile exchange, established in the 14th century

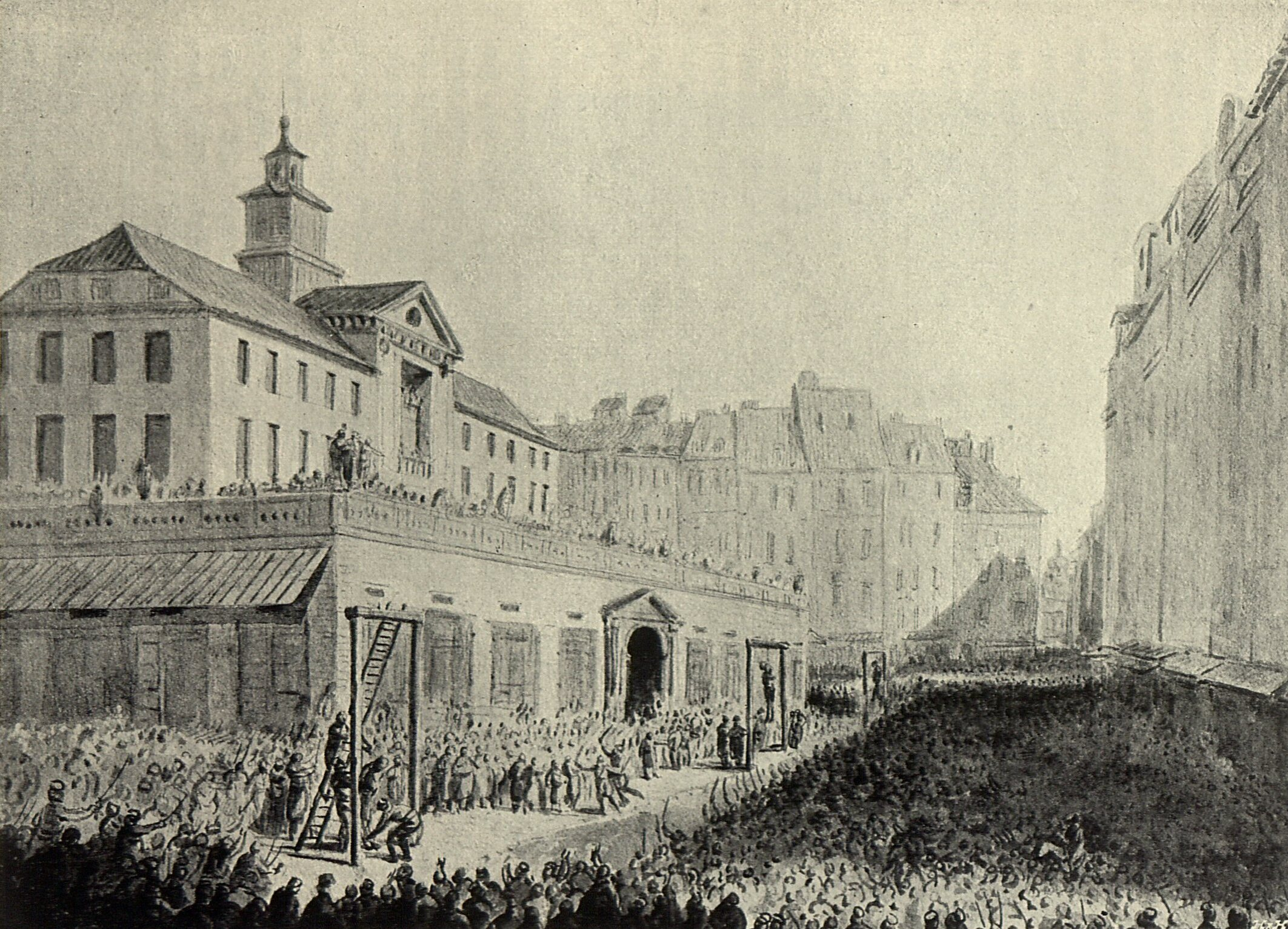
Old Town Hall, place of securities trading before the establishing of the Mercantile Exchange in 1817. Demolished in 1817.

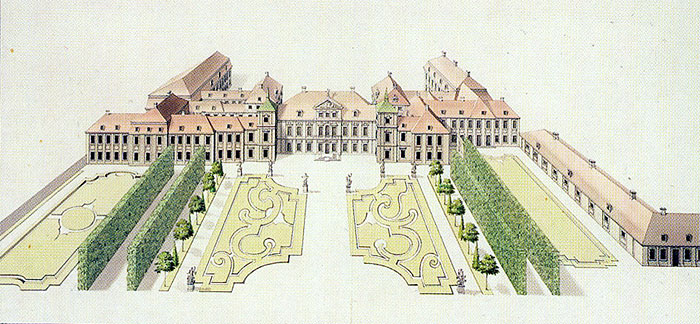
Saxon Palace, the first seat of the Warsaw Exchange from 1817 to 1828. Destroyed in 1944 by the Germans.

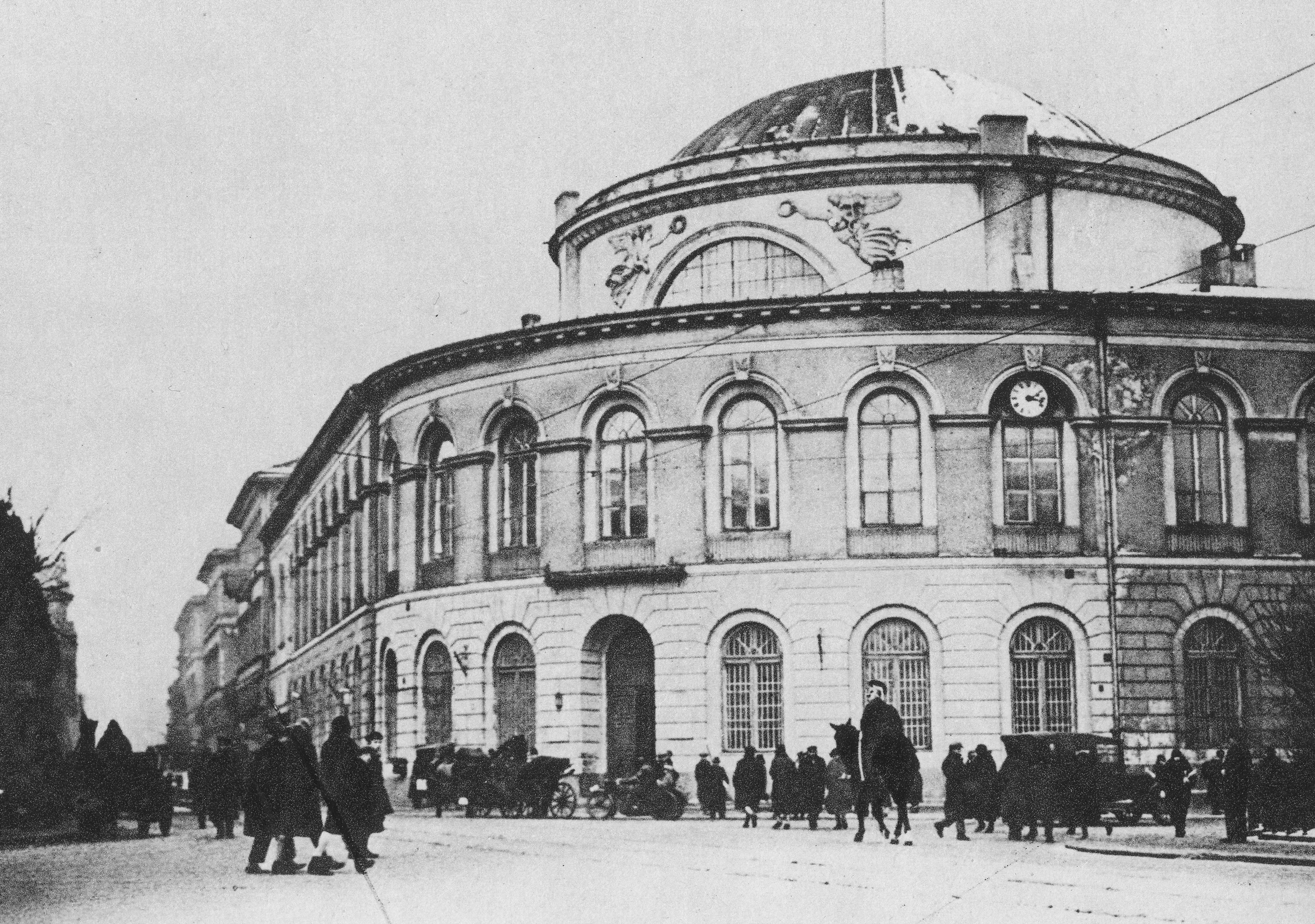
Bank of Poland and Exchange Building, home of the exchange from 1828 to 1876

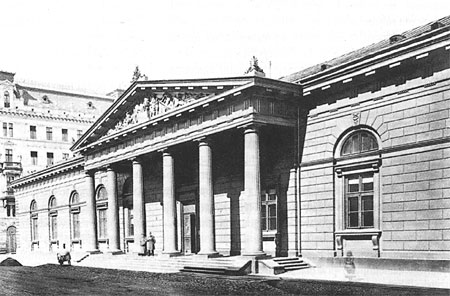
Exchange Building, home of the exchange from 1877 until World War II. It was completely destroyed in the war.

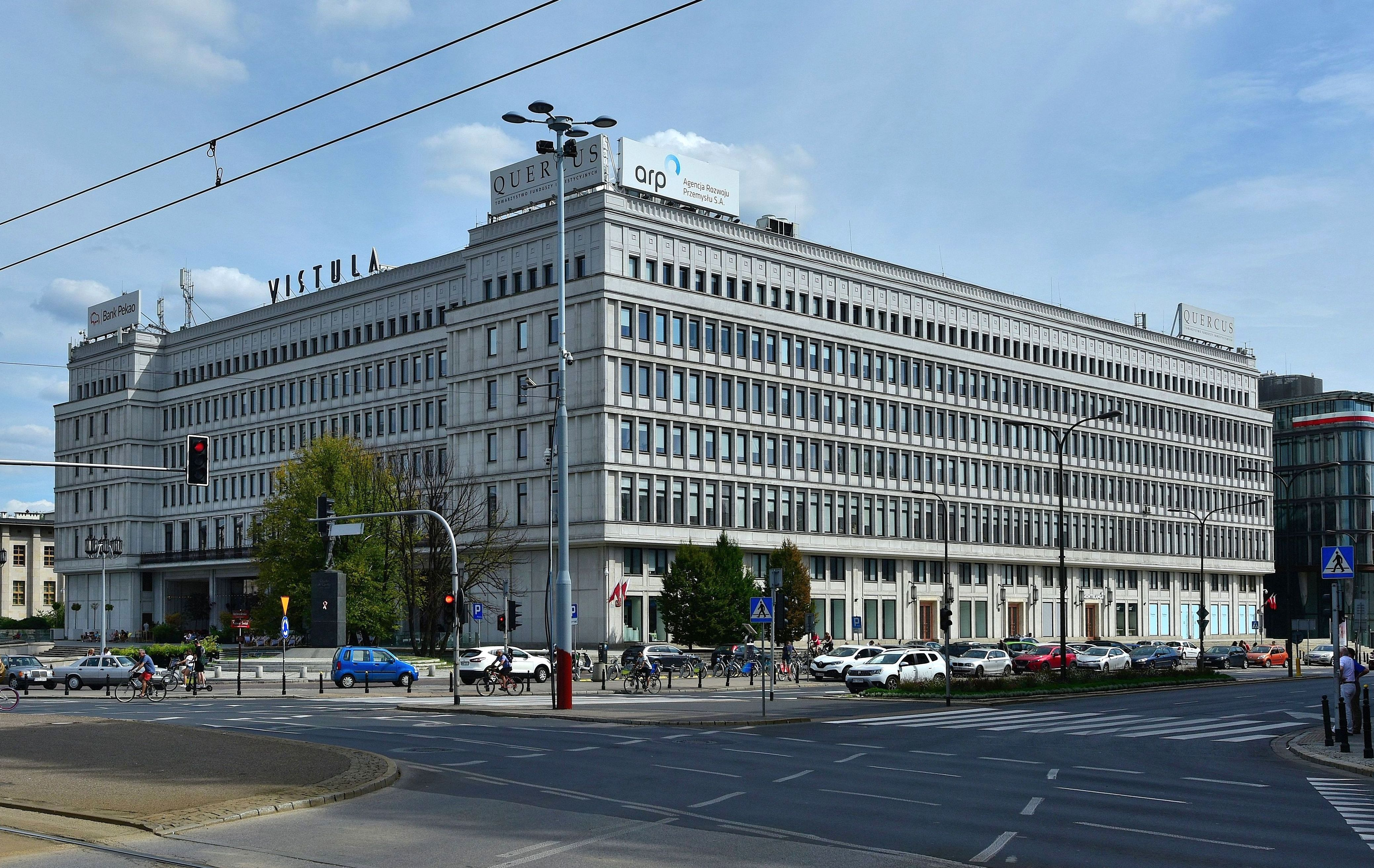
Centre of Banking and Finance, home of the WSE from 1991 to 2000. It was once the seat of the Polish United Workers' Party.

=== Kingdom of Poland ===
Warsaw became the capital and financial center of Poland in the early 17th century. In the Middle Ages other Polish towns, most of them members of the Hanseatic League, were the leading economic centers of Poland. Merchants from western and southern Europe settled in Poland since the beginning of Polish statehood. They brought the system of organized exchange trading in securities, mostly bills and currencies, to Poland. The oldest Polish bill was issued in 1243 by the Cuyavien bishop Sambor. The main centers of securities tradings were at the lower Vistula, in the 14th century occupied by the Teutonic Knights. The first mercantile exchanges emerged in Gdańsk (1379), Toruń (1385), Malbork (14th century), Kraków (1405), Poznań (1429), Zamość (1590), Królewiec (1613) and Elbląg (1744).

=== Polish–Lithuanian Commonwealth ===
Early mercantile trade in securities emerged in Warsaw in the 15th and 16th century and was based on privileges by the Masovian Dukes and later Polish Kings. The original privileges are lost, but they have been mentioned and affirmed by King John II Casimir in 1658. An archetype of the Warsaw Exchange was first mentioned in 1624–1625. In 1643 Adam Zarzebski, the chief architect of King Władysław IV, mentioned a stone building on the Old Market Square as the seat of the Exchange, probably a part of the Old Town Hall. The securities trading minutes of the Warsaw merchants in the Old Town Hall have been recorded since 1757. The legal framework for the trading in securities was first codified by the Polish Sejm in 1775. As one of the first Polish corporations Kompania Manufaktur Welnianych issued its first 120 shares in 1768. The first Polish bonds were issued in 1782 by King Stanisław August.

=== Duchy of Warsaw ===
In 1808, the Duchy of Warsaw adopted the Napoleonic Code including the Code de Commerce. The Code de Commerce also regulated stock exchange law and there were efforts made to establish a state-organized exchange on the basis of this code in Warsaw. However, due to the Napoleonic Wars and the Congress of Vienna, the plans had to be postponed.

=== Congress Poland ===
The first state-organized exchange in Poland, the Warsaw Mercantile Exchange (Giełda Kupiecka w Warszawie), was established in Warsaw by a decree of viceregent Grand Duke Constantine Romanov dated 12 May 1817. The first trading took place in the Old Town Hall on 16 May 1817 and moved in the same year to the Saxon Palace as the Old Town Hall was destroyed in the same year. Exchange trading in securities also was held in the trading house Marywil but were moved to the house of building of the Polish Central Bank in 1828 and to the building of the Financial Commission and Confraternity Harmonia in 1876, before in 1877 the Warsaw Mercantile Exchange moved into its own building at the Saxon Garden.

The Warsaw Mercantile Exchange grew rapidly. The number of brokers doubled between 1817 and 1822. In the first half of the 19th century mainly bills, debentures and bonds were traded, while share trading on a broader scale developed in the second half of that century. The first public security to be traded on the Warsaw Mercantile Exchange was the debentures of Towarzystwo Kredytowe Ziemskie issued in 1826. The first shares admitted to trading were issued by railroad companies in the 1840s. Until 1853 trading sessions were twice a week between 1pm and 2pm. In 1873 a new, more liberal, stock exchange act was passed, separating the trade in securities and commodities. A separate Warsaw Commodities Exchange was founded in 1874. Central Europe was subject to a big bull market after the Franco-Prussian War of 1870–1871, followed by a harsh crash starting at the Vienna Stock Exchange in the later 1870s. However, the Warsaw Mercantile Exchange constantly grew until World War I. On August 4, 1914, the Warsaw Stock Exchange was closed and was reactivated only on January 2, 1921. It operated under the name of "The Warsaw Money Exchange" and was based in Królewska Street.

=== Second Polish Republic ===
The Warsaw Money Exchange (Giełda Pieniężna w Warszawie) was reopened after World War I in 1919 and again in 1921. Between 1919 and 1939, the Warsaw Money Exchange was by far the largest of several bourses in different Polish cities (Katowice, Kraków, Lwów, Łódź, Poznań and Wilno), and accounted for 95% of the volume and 65 to 85% of the transactions traded on the Polish capital market. The Warsaw Money Exchange had more than 150 participants, 25 brokers, and more than 130 issuers. Its yearly turnover amounted to 1 billion PLZ. A new stock exchange law was passed in 1921 and again in 1926 and 1935. The Polish exchanges were subject to the world crises of 1929, but they recovered in the second half of the 1930s until the Second World War. In 1939 Poland was occupied by German and Soviet forces and all Polish stock exchanges were closed.

=== Third Polish Republic ===
It was only after the end of Communism in Poland in 1989 that the Warsaw Stock Exchange could be reestablished. Much needed experience and financial aid was provided by France (especially the Société des Bourses Françaises). The WSE began activity in its present form on 16 April 1991. On the first trading day only five stocks were listed (Tonsil, Próchnik, Krosno, Kable, and Exbud). Seven brokerages took part in the trading, and there were 112 buy and sell orders, with a turnover of only 1,990 złotys ($2,000).

In the years 1991–2000, the stock exchange was in the building which during the previous, and then recent, Communist years had been the seat of the Central Committee of the ruling Polish United Workers' Party. This can be considered an interesting reflection on the rapid transition of Poland from a Communist to a market economy.

Since then the WSE has been developing and growing rapidly and is now perceived as well established on the European market. In September 2008 the stock exchange was recognized as an "Advanced Emerging" exchange by FTSE, alongside markets from such countries as South Korea or Taiwan.

On 29 September 2017, the index provider FTSE Russell has announced the results of the annual classification of markets. Polish market has been upgraded from Emerging Market to Developed Market status.

In 2019, the Warsaw Stock Exchange announced plans to launch a private market based on a blockchain. Michał Piątek, the WSE's director responsible for the development of new businesses said that: "the planned WSE Private Market will be based on the blockchain technology. The platform is supposed to connect companies seeking capital with investors on the private market thanks to the technology used as the foundation of Bitcoin and other cryptocurrencies".

In 2020, the WSE achieved a significant success when it comes to the gaming market, as it had more gaming companies listed than the Tokyo Stock Exchange and became a global leader of the gaming stock sector.

On 28 June 2022, the Warsaw Stock Exchange acquired 65.03% of shares in the Armenia Securities Exchange (AMX) in Yerevan, which had been approved by the Central Bank of Armenia.

== Legal framework ==
The legal framework for exchange operations is provided by three acts from 29 July 2005:

- Act on Public Offering, Conditions Governing the Introduction of Financial Instruments to Organised Trading, and Public Companies
- Act on Trading in Financial Instruments
- Act on Capital Market Supervision

Additionally, the WSE is governed by the Code of Commercial Companies of 2000, the Statutes of the Warsaw Stock Exchange, the Rules of the Warsaw Stock Exchange, and the Rules of the Stock Exchange Court.

== Structure and operations ==
The WSE is a joint stock company founded by the State Treasury. The Treasury holds 35% share in capital.

The following instruments are traded on the WSE: shares, bonds, subscription rights, allotments, and derivatives such as futures, options, and index participation units.

Since its inception, the WSE has engaged in electronic trading. The WARSET trading platform has been in use from November 2000 to April 2013; it has been superseded by the UTP platform, based on the NYSE Euronext platform formerly having the same name. An additional market called NewConnect was introduced on 30 August 2007.

The exchange has pre-market sessions from 08:00am to 09:00am, normal trading sessions from 09:00am to 04:50pm and post-market sessions from 04:50pm to 05:00pm on all days of the week except Saturdays, Sundays and holidays declared by the Exchange in advance.

== Authorities ==
The highest authority of the Warsaw Stock Exchange is the General Meeting of Shareholders of the WSE. All Stock Exchange shareholders have the right to participate in the general meeting.

The Exchange Supervisory Board supervises the activities of the Exchange. It consists of 5 to 7 members. The Exchange Supervisory Board meets at least once a quarter. The term of office of its members is joint and lasts three years.

The Exchange Management Board manages the day-to-day operations of the Exchange, admits securities to exchange trading, defines the rules for introducing securities to trading, supervises the activities of exchange brokers and exchange members in the field of exchange trading.

The Exchange Management Board consists of 3 to 5 members. The work of the management board is managed by the President of the management board appointed by the General Meeting. Currently, the president of the WSE is Tomasz Bardziłowski.

== Statistics ==
The capitalisation of 432 domestic companies listed on the Main Market was PLN 645.0 billion (EUR 152.6 billion) at the end of June 2017. The total capitalisation of 483 domestic and foreign companies listed on the GPW Main Market was PLN 1,316.5 billion (EUR 311.5 billion) at the end of June 2017. Total value of trade in equities on the Main Market was PLN 30.3 billion

== Stock market indices ==
There are fifteen indices on the WSE.

- WIG
- WIG20
- WIG30
- mWIG40
- sWIG80

=== Sector indices ===
- WIG-BANKI
- WIG-BUDOW
- WIG-CHEMIA
- WIG-DEWEL
- WIG-ENERG
- WIG-INFO
- WIG-MEDIA
- WIG-PALIWA
- WIG-PL
- WIG-SPOZYW
- WIG-SUROWCE
- WIG-TELKOM

== Index Tracking and International Connectivity ==
Passive exposure to the main WIG20 index for international investors is possible through an exchange-traded fund - Expat Poland WIG20 UCITS ETF - listed in Frankfurt on Xetra (ticker: PLX, ISIN: BGPLWIG04173) and traded in euro. The fund acts as a conduit for capital flows between the international financial markets and the Polish capital market.

== See also ==
- List of stock exchanges
- List of European stock exchanges
- Polish Financial Supervision Authority
- NewConnect
