= Włodzimierz Mucha =

Polish architect and designer (1956–2019)

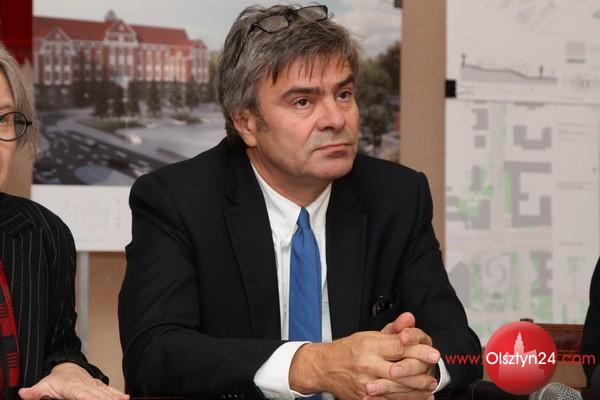
- Włodzimierz Mucha, 2013
- Born: 21 January 1956; Olsztyn, Poland
- Died: 13 October 2019 (aged 63)
- Education: Warsaw University of Technology
- Occupation: Architect
- Children: 1
- Practice: Bulanda & Mucha Architects
- Website: http://bimarch.pl

Włodzimierz Mucha (January 21, 1956 - October 13, 2019) was a Polish architect, designer and partner at Bulanda & Mucha Architects. Co-winner of SARP Honorary Award in 2015.

Mucha was born in Olsztyn. He is the co-creator with Andrzej Bulanda of many award-winning competition projects and completed works such as the BRE Bank building in Bydgoszcz, the Old Paper Mill in Konstancin-Jeziorna, the Sports Hall in Konstancin-Jeziorna, the Cameratta complex at Eko-Park in Warsaw, the expansion of the Public Library building in Warsaw, the Prudential in Warsaw, the Kazimierz Pułaski Museum in Warka, the Koneser complex in Warsaw, Rother's Mills in Bydgoszcz, sports club “Deski”, Piękna Nova in Warsaw and Chmielna 25 in Warsaw.

He gained architectural experience at Spółdzielnia Pracy Twórczej Architektów i Plastyków ESPEA (lit. Cooperative for Creative Work of Architects and Artists) nad JEMS Architects.
