= Maciej Miłobędzki =

Polish architect

- Born: 1959 (age 66–67); Warsaw, Poland
- Education: Warsaw University of Technology
- Occupation: Architect
- Practice: JEMS Architekci
- Website: http://jems.pl

Maciej Miłobędzki (born in 1959 in Warsaw) – is a Polish architect and partner with JEMS Architects, Warsaw.

== Biography ==
Miłobędzki was born in 1959 in Warsaw to Adam Miłobędzki (1924–2003) and his wife, Joanna (1927–1988). His grandfather was Tadeusz Miłobędzki.

In 1985 he graduated from the Warsaw University of Technology. In 1988, still under the socialist regime, he founded together with Jerzy Szczepanik-Dzikowski and Olgierd Jagiełło the architectural studio called JEMS Architekci.

Among their best-known designs are the Hoover Square in Warsaw (2012), the Polish Embassy in Berlin (2012) and the Raczyński Library extension in Poznań (2014). In 2002 he with JEMS Architekci members: Olgierd Jagiełło, Jerzy Szczepanik-Dzikowski and Marcin Sadowski received the SARP Honorary Award.

In 2015 they won the SARP Award of the Year for their design for the International Conference Centre in Katowice.

The JEMS Architekci has no central person. Maciej Miłobędzki, as one of the key architects, usually acts the role of the equivalent of the artistic director. Mostly, he prepares the first sketches, watches over the visual and artistic setting of the projects.
