= Fikus =

Fikus may refer to:

- Fikus, a track from the album The Story of the Ghost by Phish
- Marian Fikus (born 1938), Polish architect
- Dariush Fikus, Polish journalist, the namesake of the Polish award in mass media, Dariusz Fikus Award
