= Bulanda & Mucha Architects =

Polish architecture company

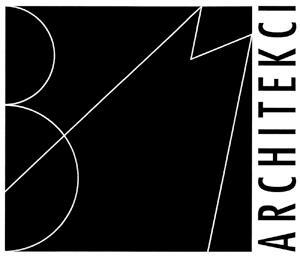

Practice information
- Key architects: Andrzej Bulanda, Włodzimierz Mucha
- Founded: 1991; 35 years ago

Significant works and honors
- Buildings: BRE Bank building in Bydgoszcz, Old Paper Mill in Konstancin-Jeziorna,
- Awards: SARP Award of the Year: 2000, 2002

Website
- www.bimarch.pl

Bulanda & Mucha Architects is a Polish studio for architecture with headquarters in Warsaw. The practice is led by its founders Andrzej Bulanda and Włodzimierz Mucha.

The studio designs modern architecture in Poland. It is considered one of the leading Polish architect studios.

Its most important design is the BRE Bank building in Bydgoszcz.
