= Home Army Museum =

Polish military museum

Coordinates: 50°04′19″N 19°56′57″E

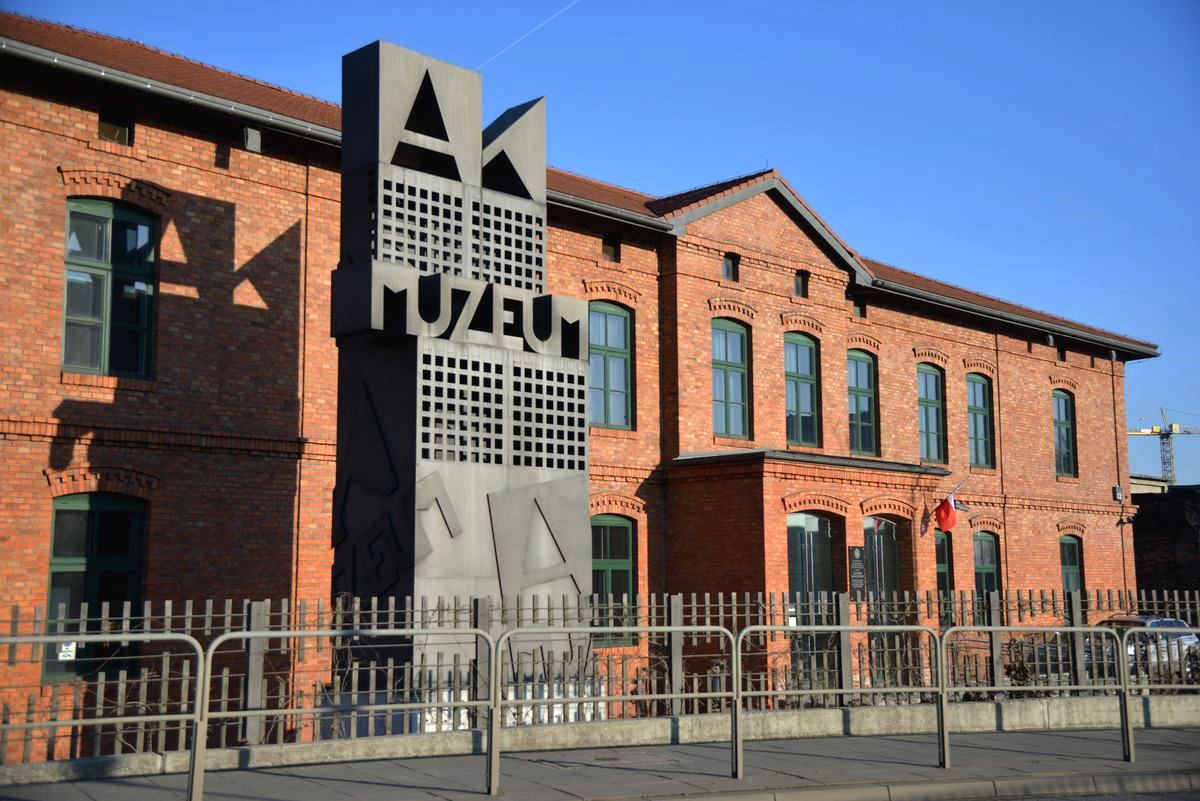
The restored building of the Home Army Museum in Krakow

The Home Army Museum (Polish: Muzeum Armii Krajowej) was created in Kraków, Poland in 2000, to commemorate the struggle for independence by the underground Polish Secret State and its military arm, the Home Army, the largest resistance movement in occupied Europe during World War II. The museum is named after general Emil August Fieldorf "Nil". It is the only such institution in Poland promoting knowledge about the Polish Underground State and its armed forces during World War II. The idea behind the Home Army Museum is to provide a holistic picture of the Polish underground, its spiritual origins and the shape of patriotic heritage to the present day.

The museum was established in 2000 as a local self-government unit but the formal establishment was preceded by a ten-year effort of collecting the historical items of the Home Army Veterans. So far, the museum has collected more than 8,000 exhibits and more than 12,000 archives – mostly gifts of Army Soldiers and their families around the world – historical memorabilia, often with the tenor of relics. The library resources reach about 11,500 volumes.

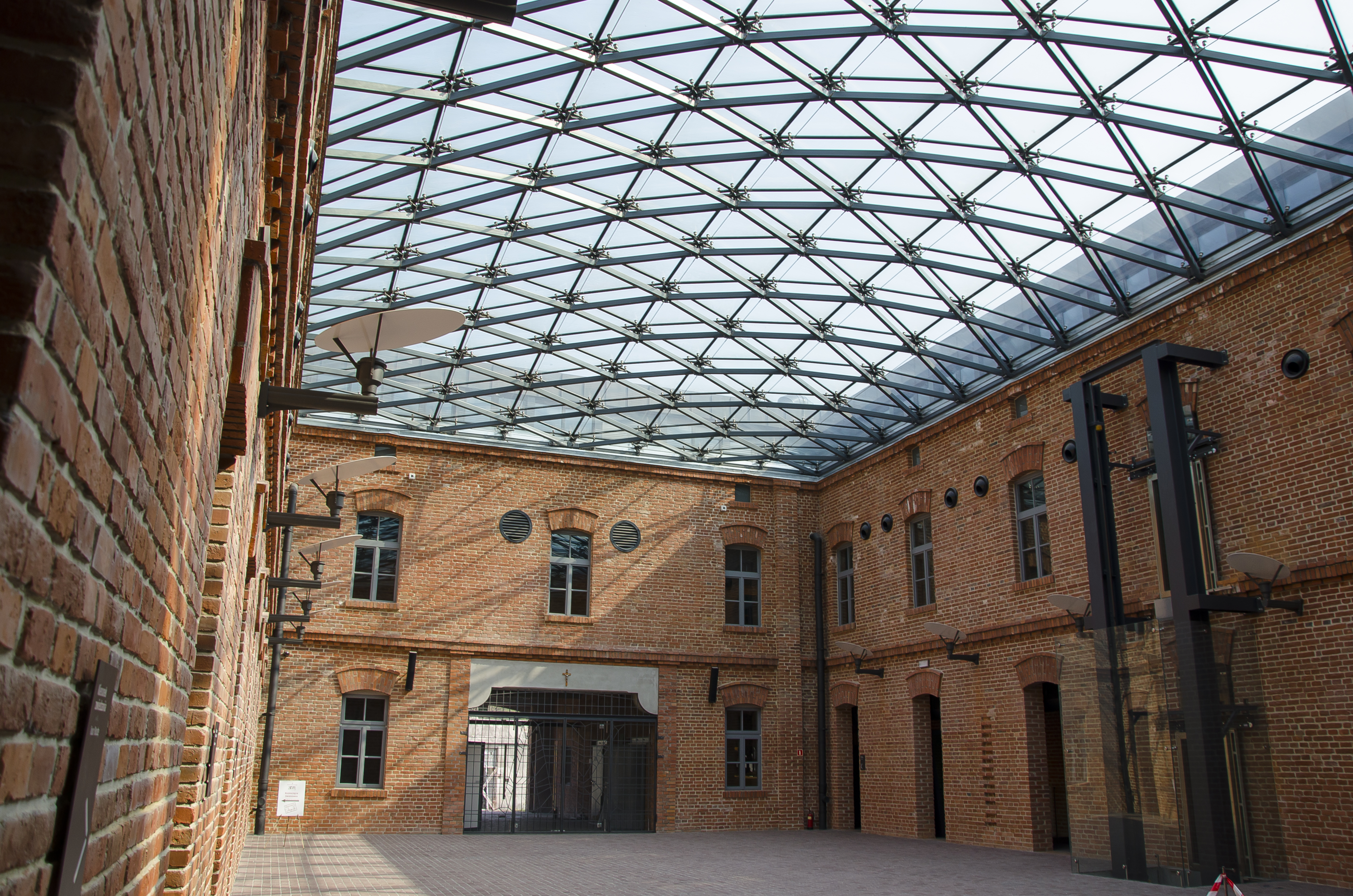
The Museum's courtyard covered with a glass roof. Designed by Ryszard Jurkowski of AiR Jurkowscy Architekci.

The permanent exhibition presents the history of Polish Underground State and Home Army in their complexity. The main section of the exhibition begins with the so-called September Campaign (Invasion of Poland, 1939). The division of Poland into two occupied zones, German and Soviet, consists of several sections (pe. Society, Terror, concentration camps, Holocaust and attitude of the Underground State towards persecuted Jews, etc.) and are well documented with photographic displays. Day-by-day life, both civilian and military, and the policy of both occupants is shown in the rich narrative scenography of the exhibition, based on documents and artefacts such as uniforms, munitions, many documents and decorations.

The main part of the exhibition is situated in the basement. Visitors are confronted with hundreds of photos and memorabilia telling stories of selected Home Army members. One of the most precious exhibits is the diary of a famous major "Hubal" – Henryk Dobrzański, the first guerilla commander of the World War II in Europe. Among other artefacts there is a replica of a fuselage section of Halifax (British heavy bomber) and a reconstructed inner structure of a V-2 rocket. The reconstruction of a detention cell in which after 1944 Polish Urząd Bezpieczeństwa (Department of Security) held members of the Home Army and postwar Freedom and Independence organisation gives the opportunity to experience the communist terror. The museum has an extensive weapon collection, including homemade projectiles.

The museum is located at Ulica Wita Stwosza 12, in the Grzegórzki District of Kraków.
