= Andrzej Bulanda =

Polish Architect

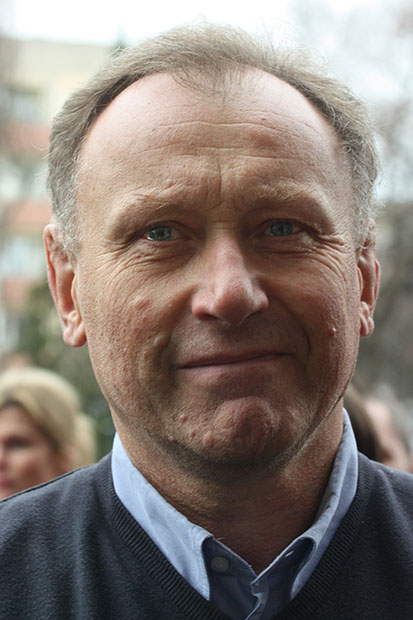
- Andrzej Bulanda (2013)
- Born: 6 July 1955 (age 71); Warsaw, Poland
- Education: Warsaw University of Technology
- Occupation: Architect
- Children: 4
- Practice: Bulanda & Mucha Architects
- Website: http://bimarch.pl

Andrzej Bulanda (born 6 July 1955 in Warsaw) - is a Polish architect, designer and partner at Bulanda & Mucha Architects. He is the co-creator with Włodzimierz Mucha of many award-winning competition projects and completed works such as the BRE Bank building in Bydgoszcz, the Old Paper Mill in Konstancin-Jeziorna, the Sports Hall in Konstancin-Jeziorna, the Cameratta complex at Eko-Park in Warsaw, the expansion of the Public Library building in Warsaw, the Prudential in Warsaw, the Kazimierz Pułaski Museum in Warka, the Koneser complex in Warsaw, Rother's Mills in Bydgoszcz, sports club “Deski”, Piękna Nova in Warsaw and Chmielna 25 in Warsaw.

Co-winner of SARP Honorary Award in 2015.

He was visiting professor at Graduate School of Design, Harvard University and at Penn State University.
