= International Biennale of Architecture in Kraków =

The International Biennale of Architecture in Kraków (Polish: Międzynarodowe Biennale Architektury w Krakowie – MBA) is a regular architectural event organised in Kraków since 1985. Each edition consists of architectural competitions and a range of accompanying events like exhibitions, presentations and lectures. Over time it has shifted from being a biennial to being held in irregular years

== History ==
The first edition of Biennale of Architecture in Kraków was organised in 1985 by a group of Polish architects gathered in The Association of Polish Architects (Polish: Stowarzyszenie Architektów Polskich – SARP) on the initiative of Romuald Loegler. The Biennale grew in importance following the democratic transition in Poland in 1989. In the 1990s Biennale became a unique forum for exchanging ideas and individual experience among the architects from all over the world. In 1994, the Biennale celebrated the astronomer, Copernicus.

During different editions of the event, projects in competitions were evaluated by Wojciech Leśnikowski, Pekka Salminen, Julia Bolles and Peter Wilson, Francesco Purini, Eckhard Feddersen, Günter Schlusche, Hildebrand Machleidt, Armando dal Fabbro, Peter Cook, Roger Hopkinson and many others. Invitged guests have included Frei Otto, Jacques Herzog, Pierre de Meuron, Zvi Hecker, David Mackay, Dietmar Eberle.

Economic and organisational constraints eventually made it impossible to go on with the original Biennale formula, although the name Biennale was retained.

In 2015, the Biennale celebrated its jubilee year, exploring the theme of "the human dimension of urban spaces." Its most recent event was in 2017.
