= Ryszard Jurkowski =

Polish architect and urban planner

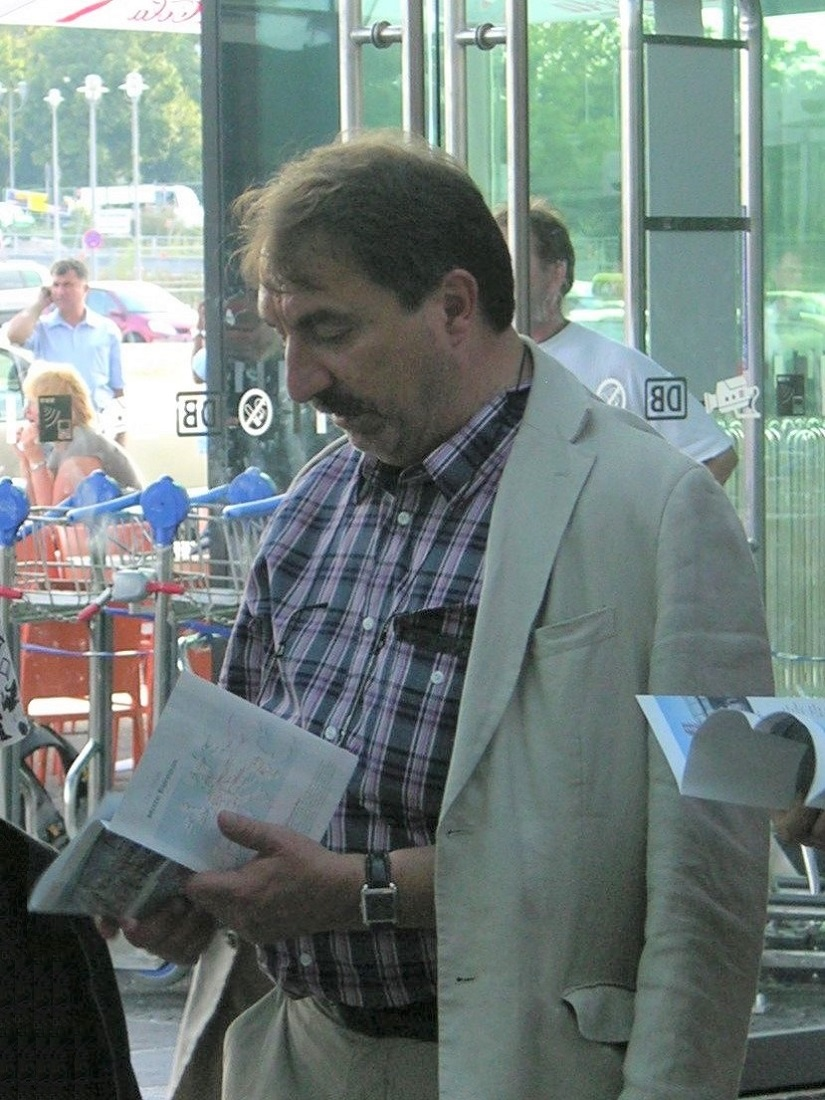
- Ryszard Jurkowski in Berlin, 2007
- Born: Ryszard Piotr Jurkowski; 28 May 1945 (age 81); Sosnowiec, Poland
- Education: Tadeusz Kościuszko Kraków University of Technology
- Occupation: Architect
- Awards: SARP Honorary Award; SARP Award of the Year; Silver and Gold Cross of Merit; Officer's Cross of the Order of Polonia Restituta
- Practice: AiR Jurkowscy Architekci
- Buildings: Home Army Museum, Kraków; City Museum, Żory
- Projects: Music Centre, Kraków; SGH Innovative Space Centre, Warsaw

Ryszard Piotr Jurkowski (born 28 May 1945) is a Polish architect and urban planner. He is noted for his contemporary and embracing minimalism design of residential, commercial, educational, industrial and civic buildings, and for his fight against the monotonous and dreary architecture of the communist era.

== Early life and career ==
Ryszard Jurkowski was born in 1945 to a working-class family in industrialised Sosnowiec within the Upper Silesian agglomeration, where later, as factories and coal mines declined, the architectural identity of the Third Polish Republic began to take shape.

Jurkowski went to Bolesław Prus Secondary School in Sosnowiec, and in 1969 he graduated with a master's degree in architecture from Kraków University of Technology, subsequently obtaining the professional qualifications to practice under the title 'architect'.

During the communist era architecture was characterised by extensive housing estates, industrial halls, and administrative buildings in various styles — from the socialist realism to the prefabricated concrete panel buildings. To Jurkowski, and another young Silesian architect Stanisław Niemczyk, these buildings appeared monotonous, repetitive, and neglectful of basic human needs.

In 1969 he joined the Regional Municipal Building Company in Sosnowiec, but two years later began working for a large architectural firm Investprojekt in Katowice. It was there that in 1984 he designed Kokociniec residential complex, where buildings with high gable roofs, overlooking home zones and attractive, accessible spaces and environments for residents, radically differed from the typical communist-era housing estate. Owing to limited availability of adequate building materials and underdeveloped construction technology, the completion of Kokociniec, along with other projects by Jurkowski, presented significant challenges, and even the need for confronting representatives of the communist Polish United Workers' Party who deemed his projects to be capricious, beyond the bounds of standards, and too distinctive in their innovative appearance, but it was this architectural style that inspired people’s hope for economic and social renewal.

Jurkowski's philosophy, which emphasises context sensitive solutions, is illustrated by the school in Wodzisław, ‘skilfully designed into the hilly landscape’. He, and his team, Janusz Kapitański and Jan Pallado, were ‘somewhat ahead of their time’ when they designed the school in 1988, situated atop a hill and surrounded by parkland. The building has an irregular shape, classrooms cascade across the sloping terrain, while the school entrance is fronted by wide stairs and marked by a turret. Through these features, the school became both a landmark and a focal point for the entire neighbourhood, simultaneously distinctive yet hidden among the greenery.

In the mid-1980s the first legal gateway for the autonomy of designers and investors opened. Architects gained the opportunity to set up cooperatives, i.e. legal entities freeing them from the work regime of state design offices, and finally gained design autonomy in 1988, along with the so-called ‘Wilczek Act’, which gave full freedom of economic activity. Thus, in 1990, Jurkowski left Investprojekt to establish, together with his wife, who also holds a degree in architecture, his own firm AiR Jurkowscy Architekci.

Between 1991 and 1996 he was a senior lecturer at Kraków University of Technology and in the years 1992-1998 and 2003-2006 the chairman of the Regional Commission for Urban Planning and Architecture in Katowice. He was also appointed a member of Poland’s General Commission for Urban Planning and Architecture in Warsaw and he played a significant role in creating the Act of 15 December 2000 on professional self-governing bodies for architects.

He was the chief coordinator of the professional architects' environments focusing on improving the standards of Polish architecture, and in 2000 was elected the president of the Association of Polish Architects, and held this position until 2006.

In 2009, after winning an international competition, he designed the Home Army Museum in Krakow. For the project, Jurkowski integrated modern elements into historic buildings of the Krakow Fortress, constructed at the beginning of the last century. The basement, once a command bunker, now features exhibitions on the Polish Underground Movement. The first floor includes a library, a reading room, and an audiovisual conference room. The attic is used for administration and offices. The inner courtyard, covered with a glass roof with a lightweight steel structure, has been described by the critics from EUmies Awards as "a spectacular space for exhibitions and events".

In 2018 Jurkowski orchestrated the publishing of the first Polish edition of On Adam’s House in Paradise: The Idea of the Primitive Hut in Architectural History (Polish: O rajskim domu Adama: Idea pierwotnej chaty w historii architektury), a literary work on the history and philosophy of architecture written by the foremost historian and critic Professor Joseph Rykwert, and published under the patronage of the National Institute of Architecture and Urban Planning (NIAIU) with a foreword from the Ministry of Culture and National Heritage.

He is also a member of the Polish Architecture Council, and of the Collegium of Architectural Design Competition SARP, taking on the roles of chairman or rapporteur of the Jury.

== Honours and awards ==
Ryszard Jurkowski is the winner of the SARP Honorary Award 1999, SARP Award of the Year 1987 and 2010 and of the 1st and 2nd degree Award of the Ministry of Construction (now the Ministry of Infrastructure).

He is the recipient of the Honoris Gratia 2011 and the Silver and Gold Cross of Merit in recognition of his achievements. In 2013 he was nominated for the European Union Prize for Contemporary Architecture / Mies van der Rohe Award for the Home Army Museum in Kraków. He is also the winner of Brick Award Polska 2013.

In 2012 he received the Officer's Cross of the Order of Polonia Restituta from the President of Poland "for his outstanding contribution to Polish architecture".

== Selected projects ==
- Kokociniec Residential Complex, Katowice (1985)
- Primary School, Wodzisław Śląski (1989)
- Churches, Sosnowiec & Częstochowa (1995 & 1996)
- MIKAMA Office Building, Sosnowiec (1997)
- Altar for Pope John Paul II on his visit to Poland (1999)
- Getin Bank, Bytom (2000)
- Qubus Hotel, Gliwice (2001)
- Kamienny Dom, Katowice (2001)
- Ahold Shopping Centre, Wodzisław Śląski (2005)
- Oskar Kolberg Philharmonic, Kielce (2006)
- Mariacka Street urban redevelopment, Katowice (2008)
- Home Army Museum, Kraków (2009)
- Ecumenical Chapel, Katowice International Airport (2009)
- Książęce Residential Complex, Katowice (2010)
- Energopol Office Building, Katowice (2012)
- City Museum and Katowice SEZ Offices, Żory (2012)
- Main Town Square urban redevelopment, Katowice (2012)
- Music Centre, Kraków (2013)
- Przy Fontannach Residential Complex, Racibórz (2016)
- SGH Innovative Space Centre, Warsaw (2017)
- Dworcowa Street urban redevelopment, Katowice (2021)
- Mercure Accor Hotel, Katowice (2021)

== Gallery ==
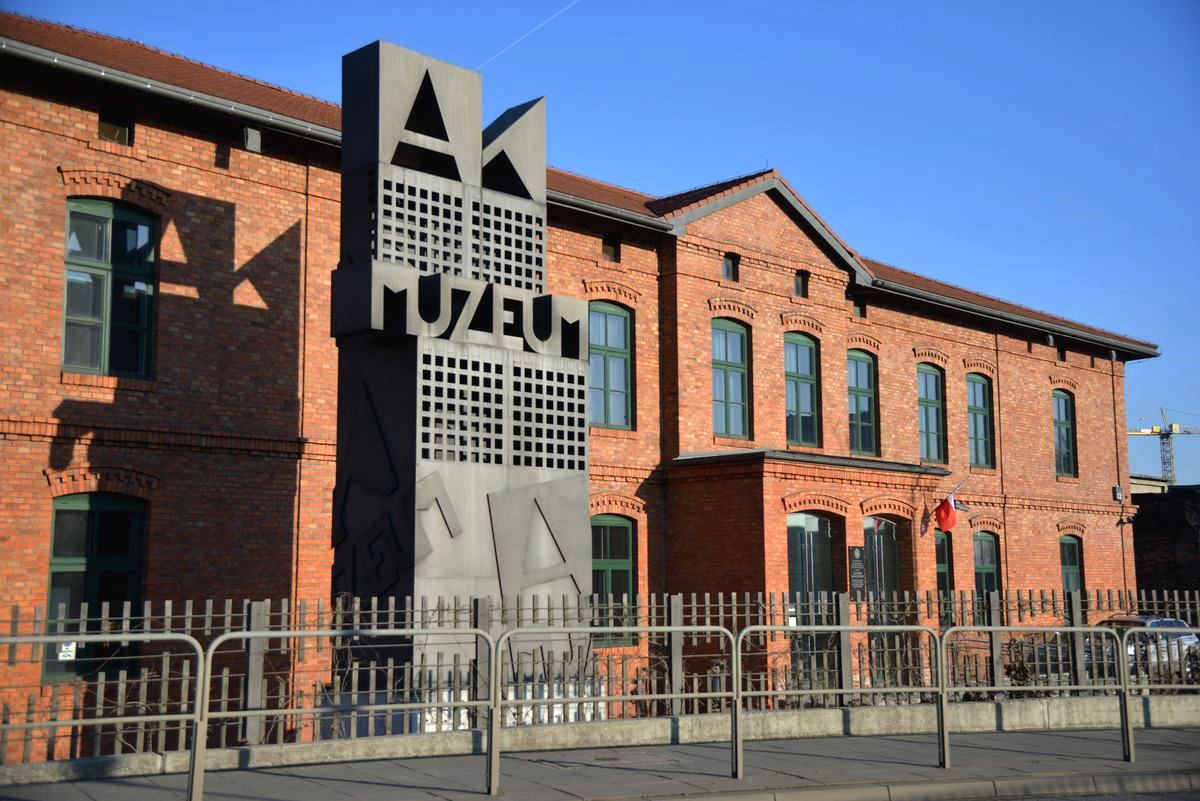
Entrance to the Home Army Museum

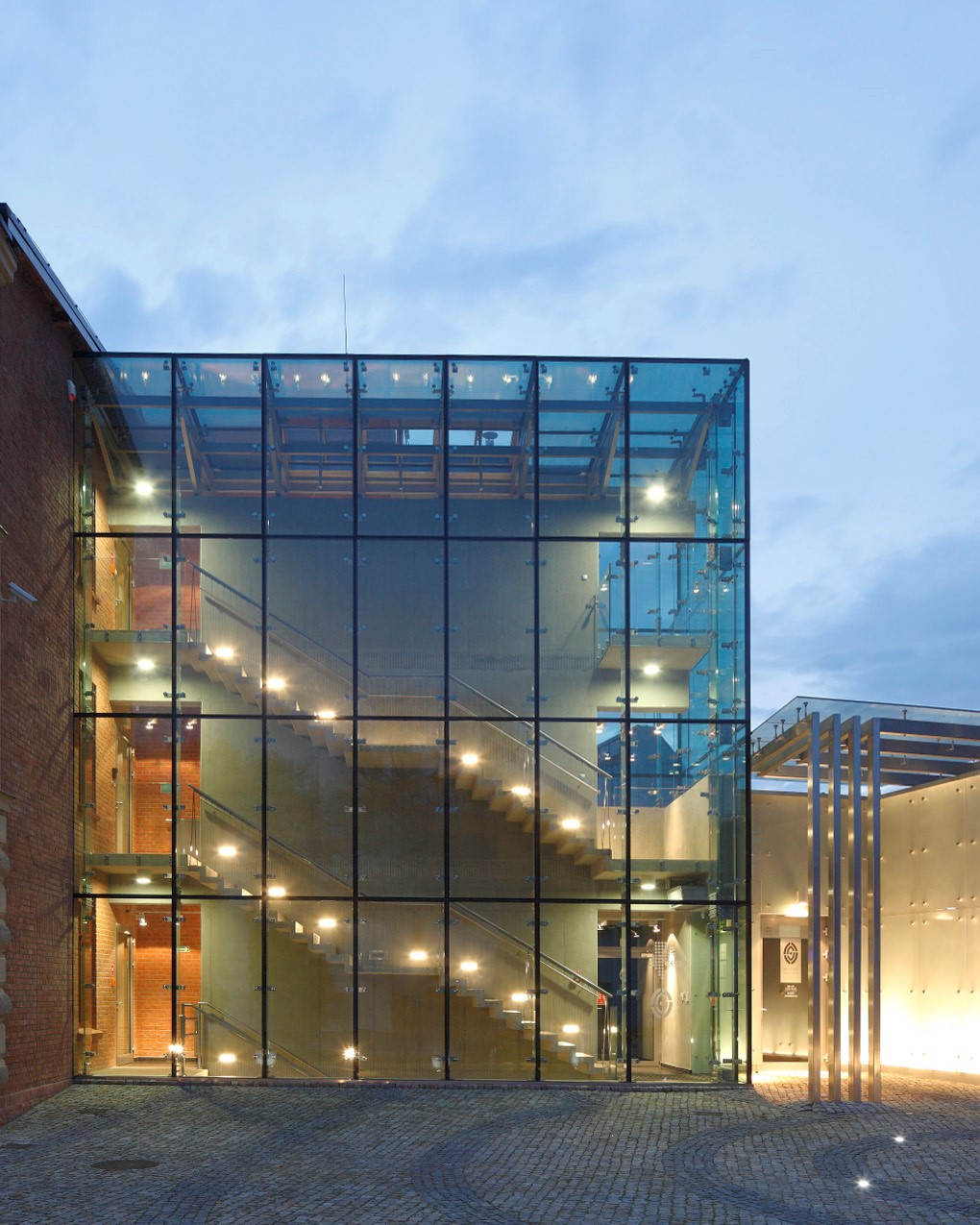
City Museum, Żory

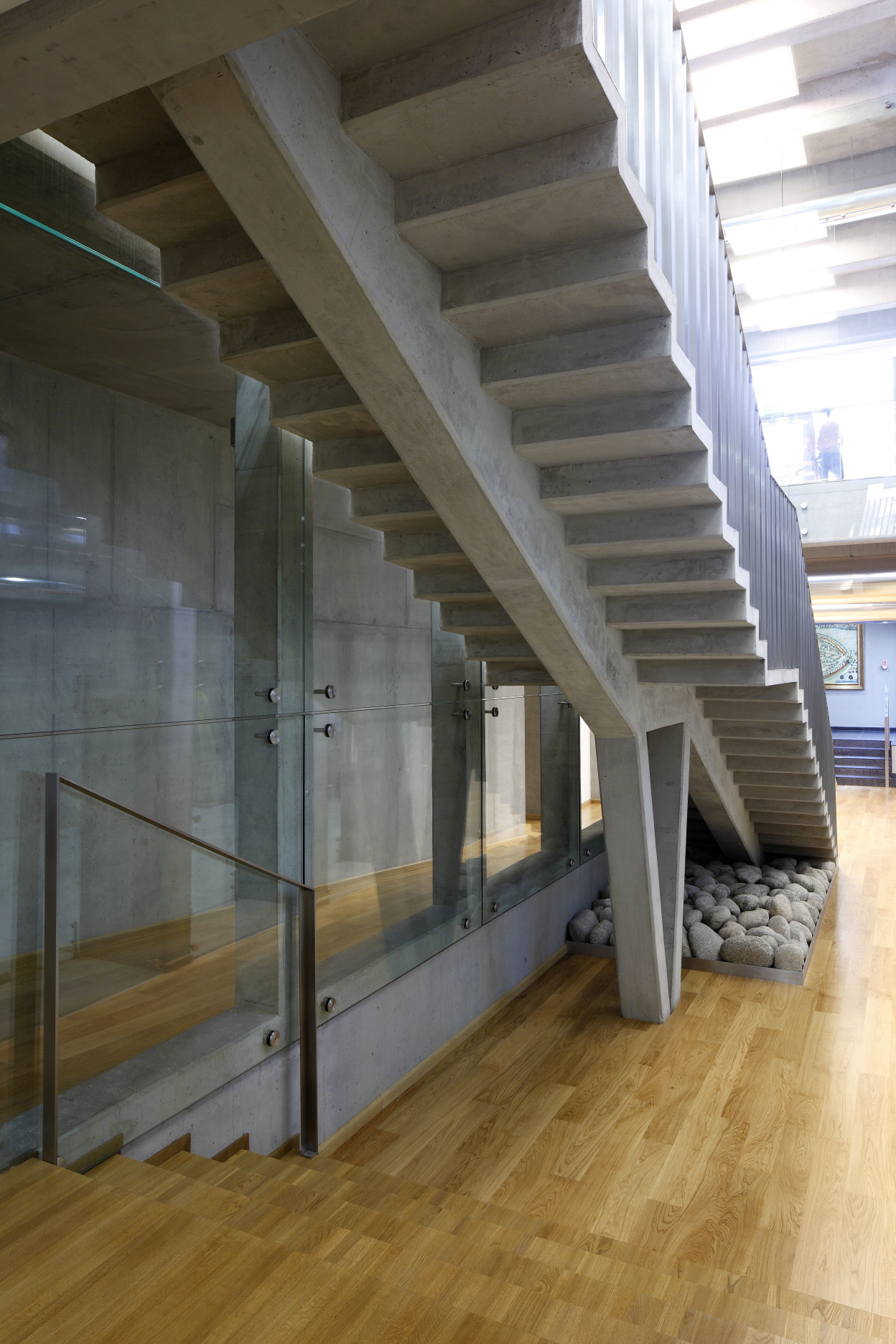
City Museum, Żory

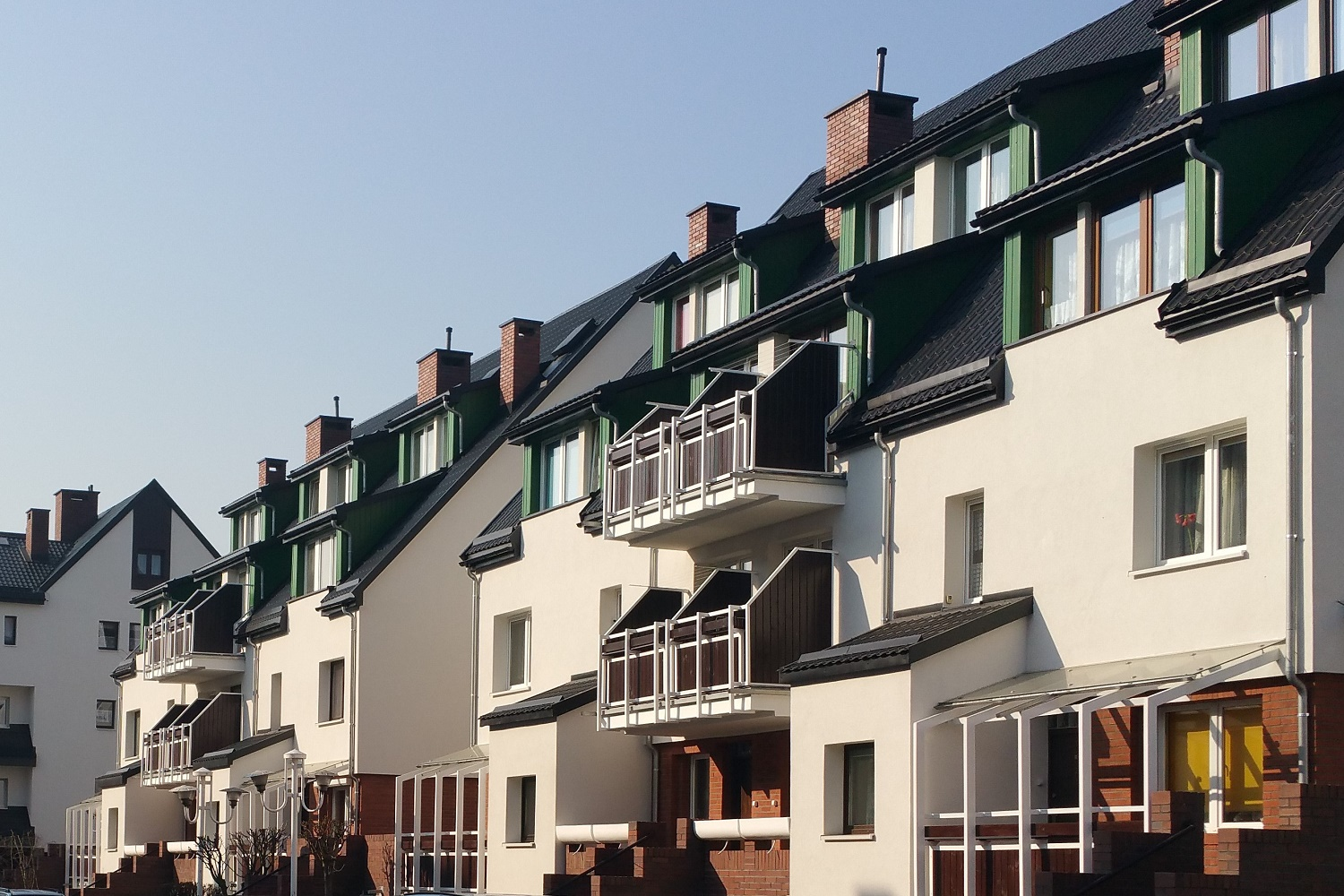
Kokociniec Residential Complex, Katowice
