= Łódź Zoo =

Łódź Zoological Garden Miejski Ogród Zoologiczny w Łodzi
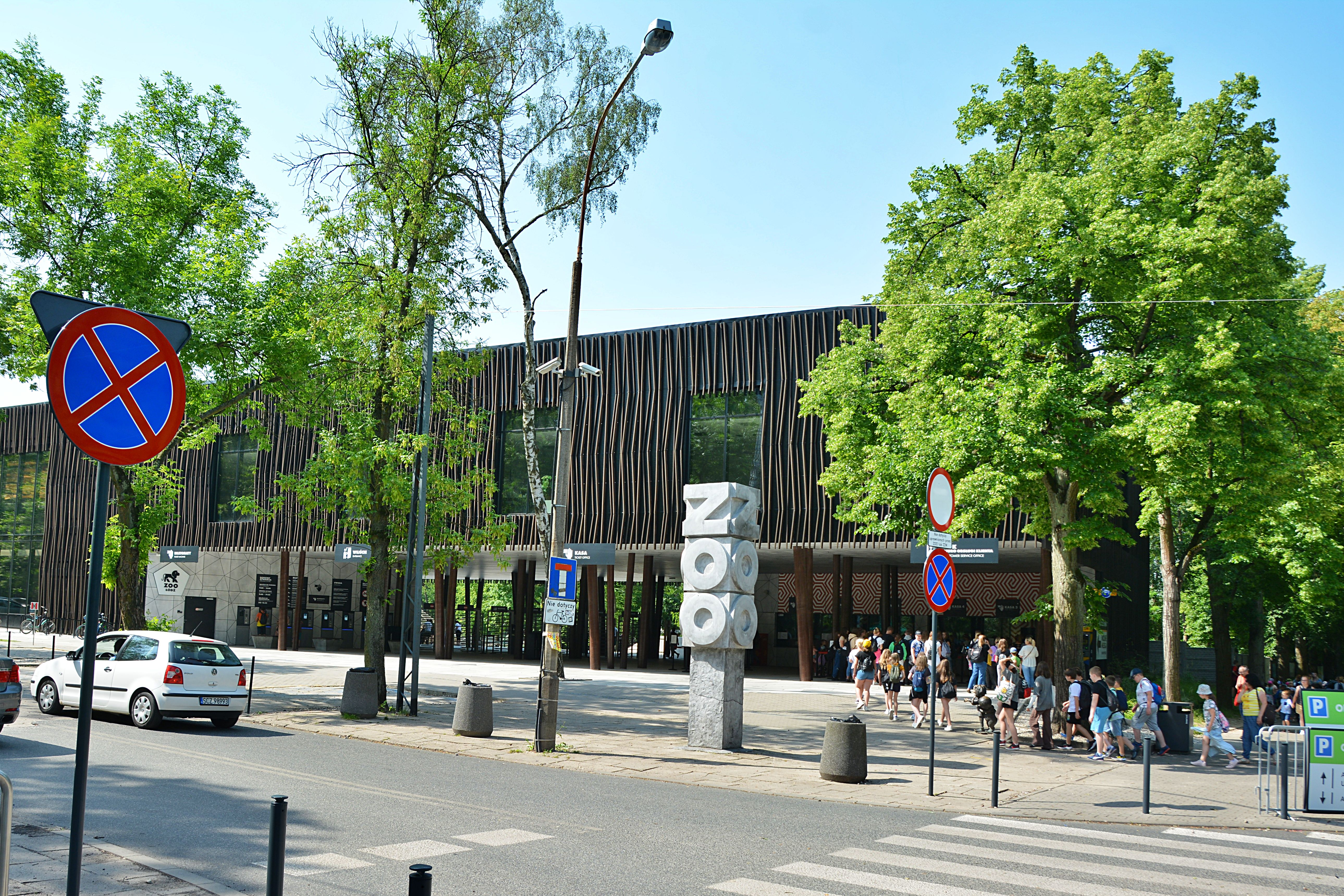
- The main entrance
- Interactive map of Łódź Zoological Garden; Miejski Ogród Zoologiczny w Łodzi
- 51°45′39″N 19°24′43″E
- Date opened: 1938
- Location: Łódź, Poland
- Land area: 16 hectares (40 acres)
- No. of animals: 2,245
- No. of species: 677
- Memberships: EAZA, WAZA
- Director: Tomasz Jóźwik
- Website: orientarium.lodz.pl/en/

The Łódź Zoo (Polish: Miejski Ogród Zoologiczny w Łodzi) is a zoological garden in the city of Łódź, Łódź Voivodeship in Poland. Established in 1938, it covers the area of 16,64 hectares in the district of Polesie and is home to 3,350 animals representing 554 species, including endangered Asiatic lions. The zoo is the only zoological garden in Poland to feature such animals as giant otters, Sumatran orangutans, false gharials, and bush dogs.

The zoo is a member of the European Association of Zoos and Aquaria, the World Association of Zoos and Aquariums and is also part of the International Species Information System.

== History ==
The zoo was opened in 1938 in the Polesie district and covered the area of 8,9 hectares. In 1939, the zoo was in possession of 50 animals such as deer, roe deer, fallow deer, ducks and sheep. The zoo emerged relatively unscathed after the Second World War and in 1945, many animals from other zoological gardens, most notably from the Wrocław Zoo, were transported to Łódź. In 1950, the area of the zoo was expanded and covered 16,64 ha. In the 1950s, the zoological garden developed more rapidly as more buildings and structures were constructed including the baboons enclosure. In 1968, the Big Cats' pavilion was opened and in 1988, to celebrate the 50th anniversary of the zoo, a pavilion for giraffes was constructed.

Since 1991, the zoo is part of the International Species Information System. In 1996, the zoo became the first zoological garden in Poland to feature Asiatic lions. In 2001, an enclosure for antelopes was built as well as new aviaries for owls and birds of prey. In 2011, a special pavilion showcasing the zoo's collection of butterflies was opened. In 2014, a pavilion housing small mammals such as binturongs, ring-tailed mongooses and Indian crested porcupines was built.

The zoo's breeding program had a number of successes which include the births of southern cassowaries in 2014 and 2016, pied tamarin in 2014 and lynx in 2015.

In 2016, a 54-year-old elephant named Magda died in the zoo after battling an illness for two years. She was one of the oldest Indian elephants in Europe.

=== Orientarium ===
In 2015, the construction of the Orientarium building started. It is the biggest investment in the history of the zoo. The whole complex will specifically feature the fauna of South-East Asia and will house such animals as orangutans, surilis, clouded leopards and sharks.

In 2022, the Orientarium was officially opened. It is the most modern zoological complex devoted to South-East Asia in Europe and has become the biggest attraction of the zoo. The main building has an area of 33 000 m² and consists of three levels including one underground. In 2023, the complex won Poland's top architecture prize the SARP Award of the Year.

== Gallery ==
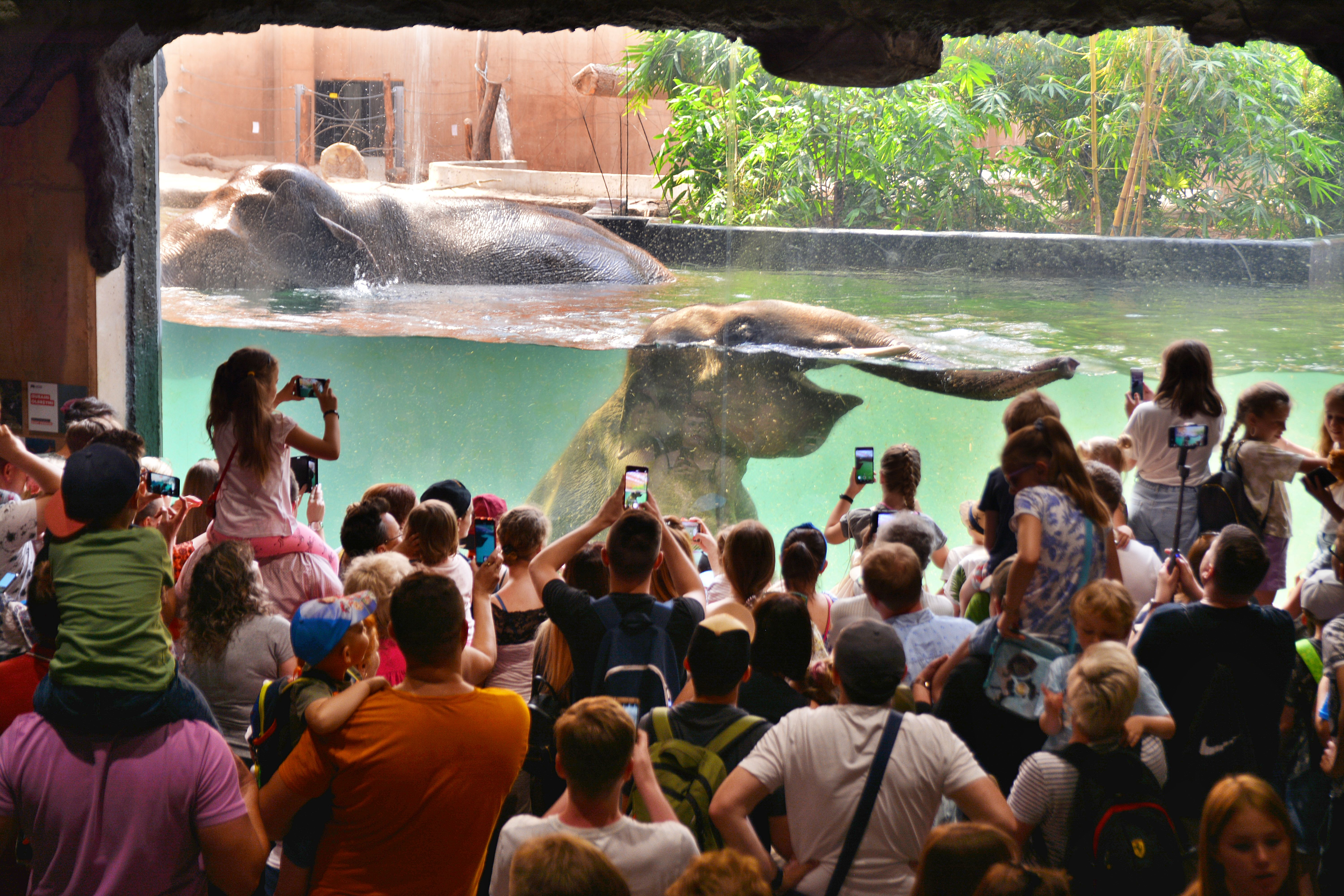
Visitors watching bathing Indian elephants

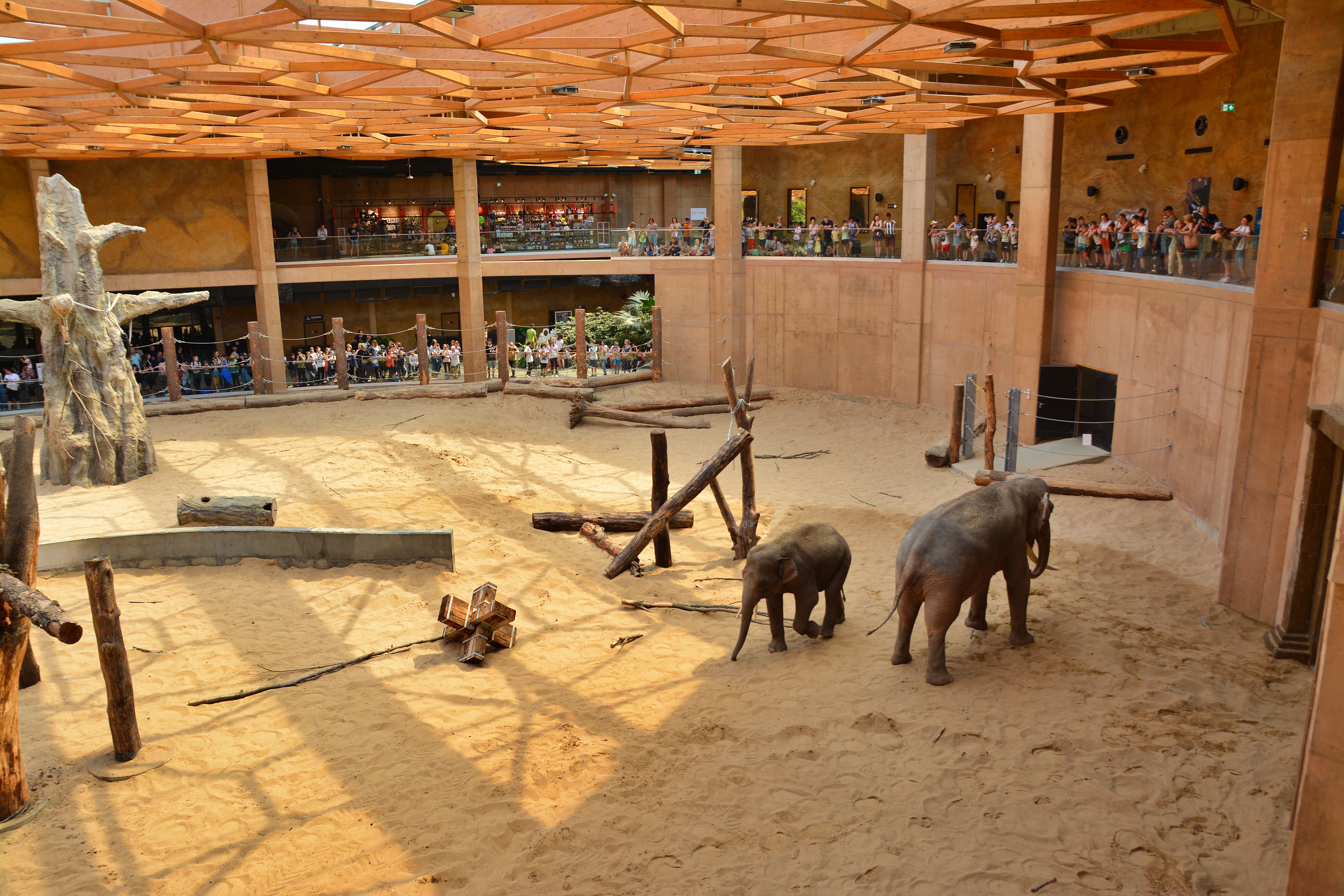
Elephants pavilion

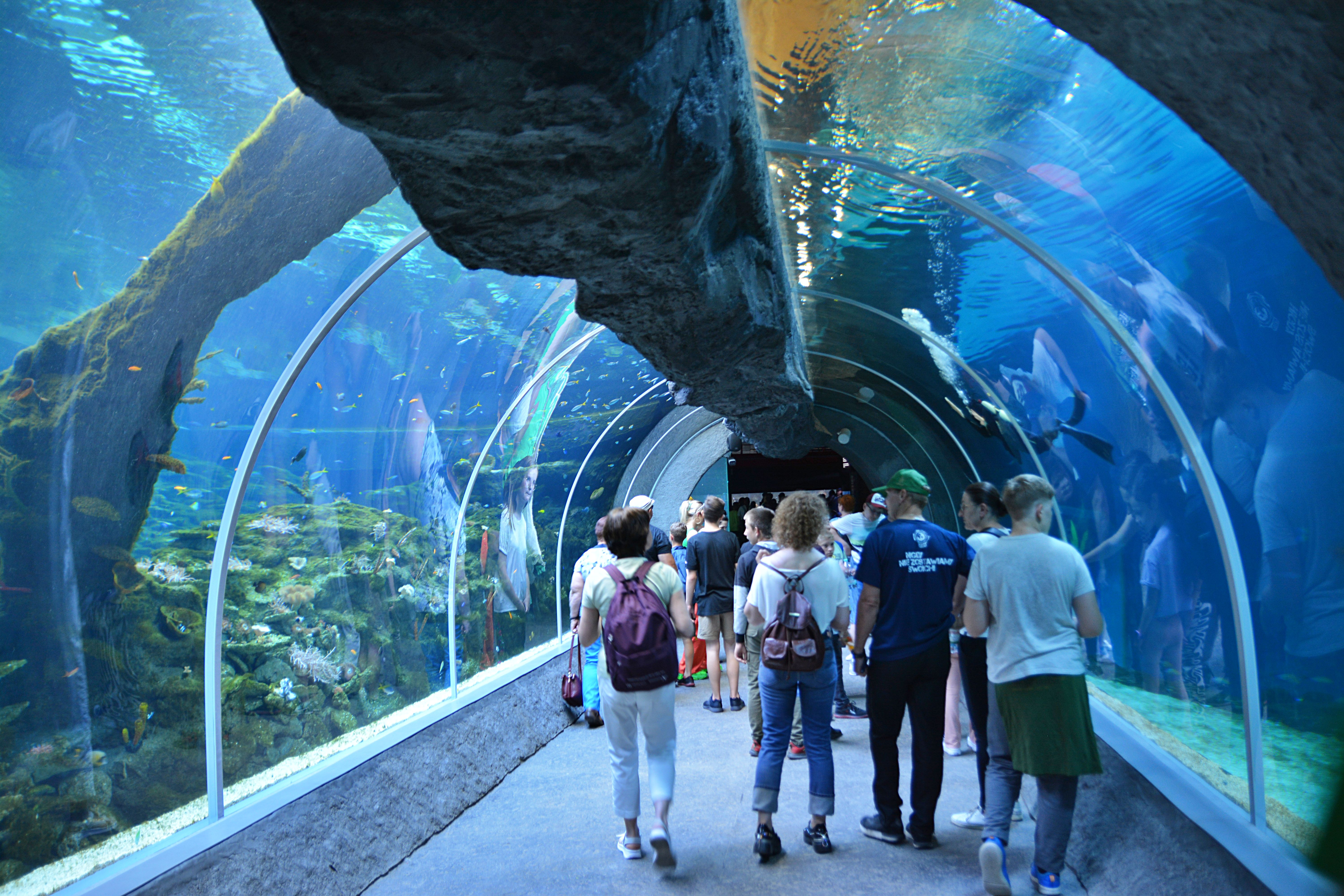
Underwater tunnel

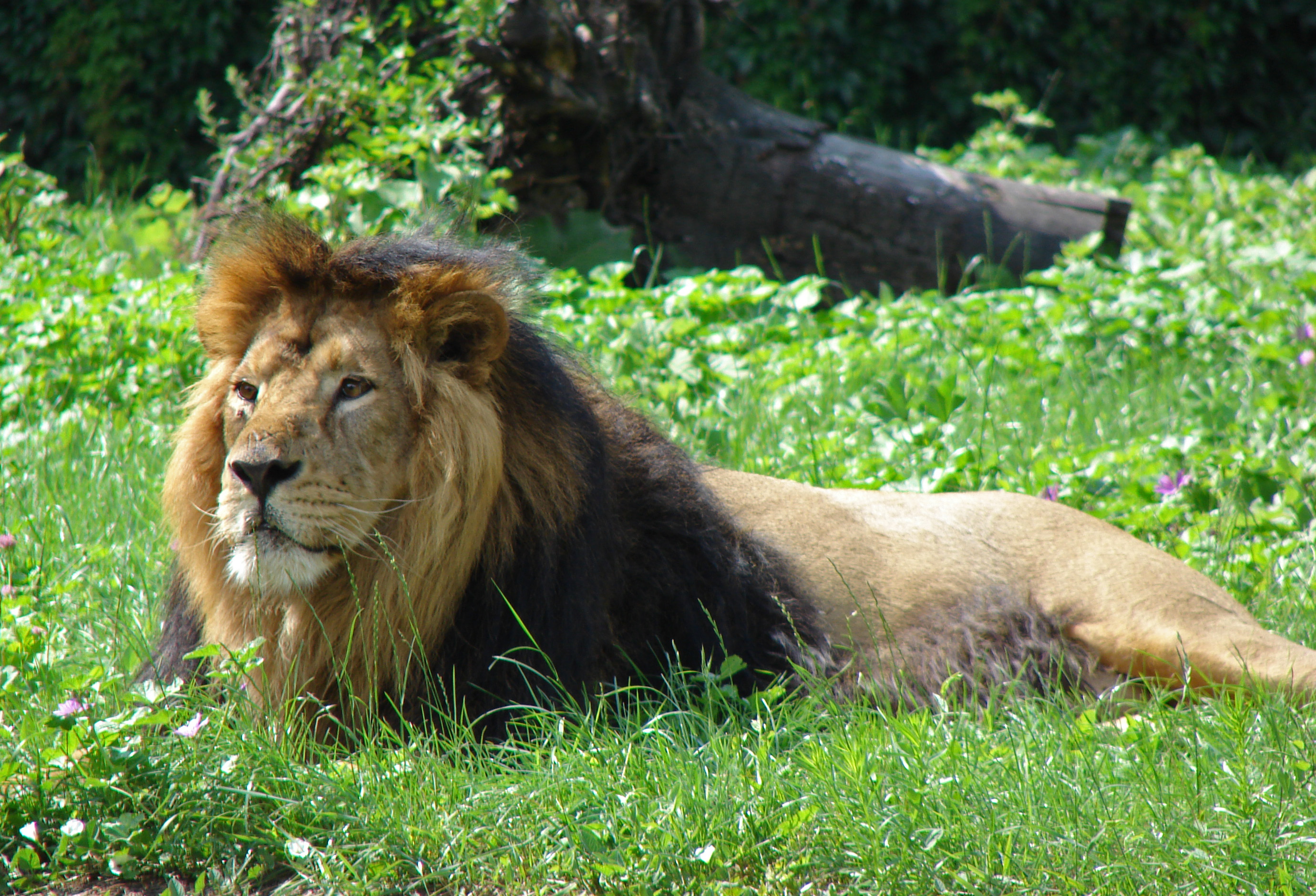
Asiatic lion

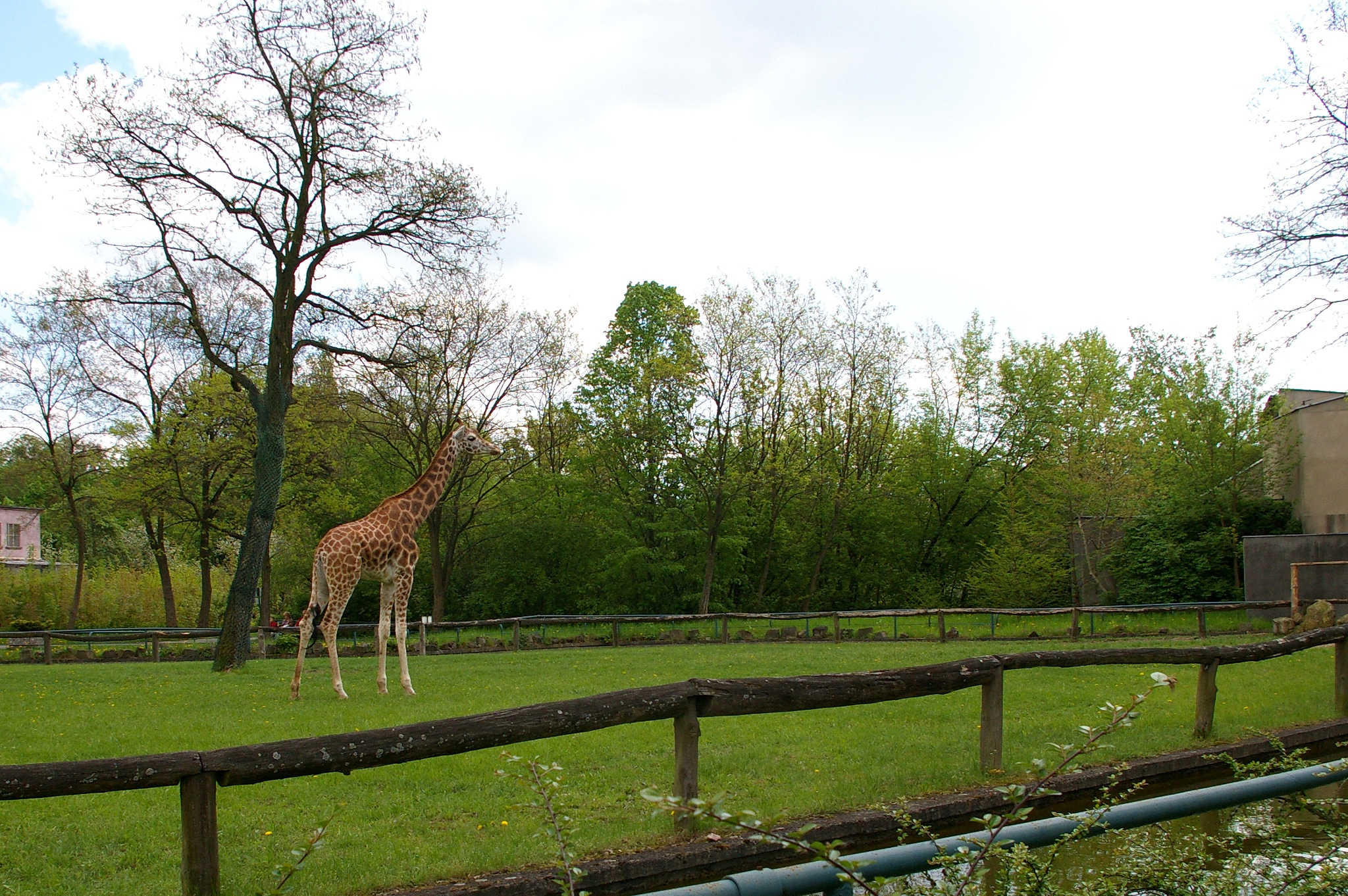
Rothschild's giraffe

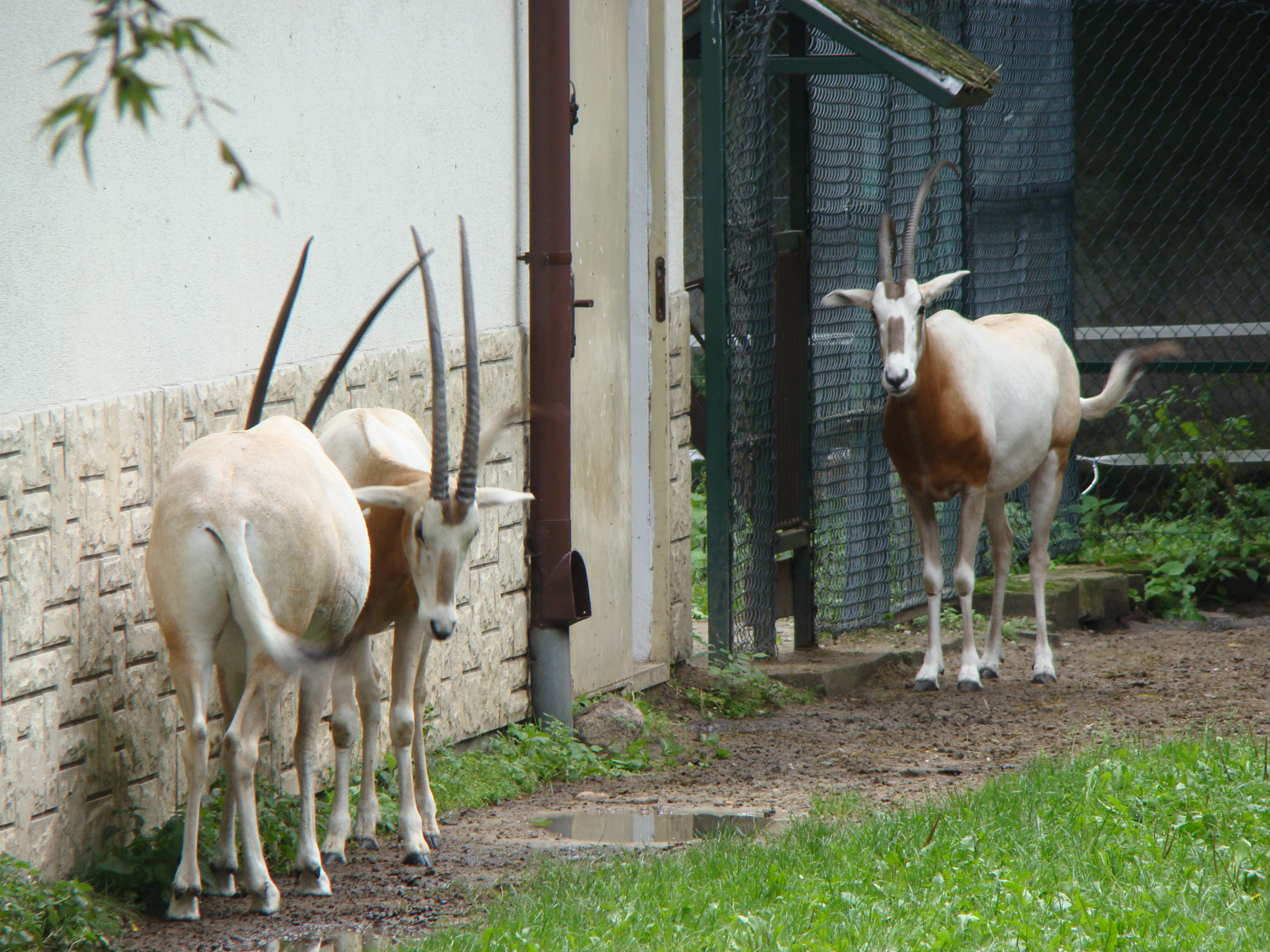
Scimitar oryx

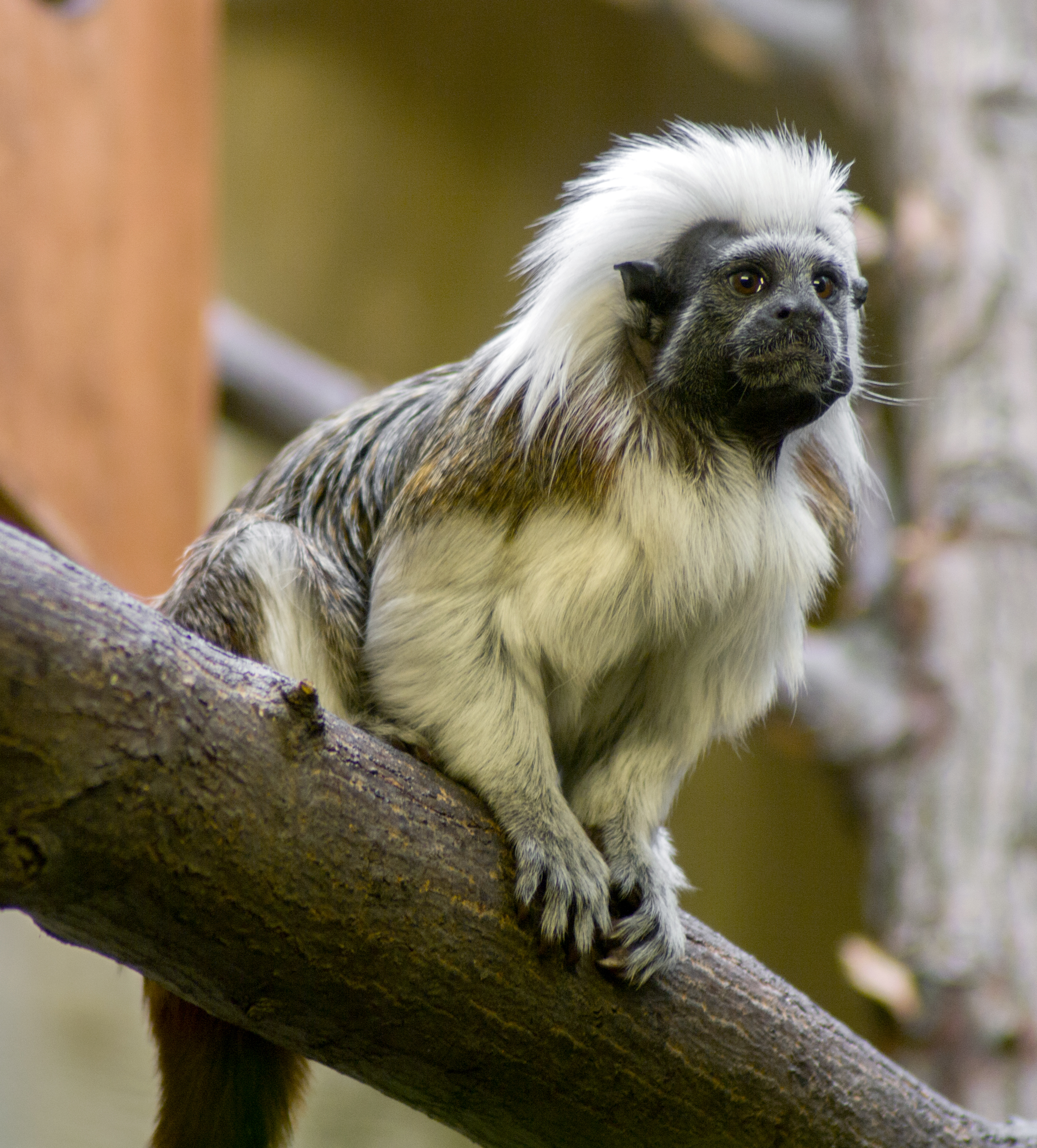
Cotton-top tamarin

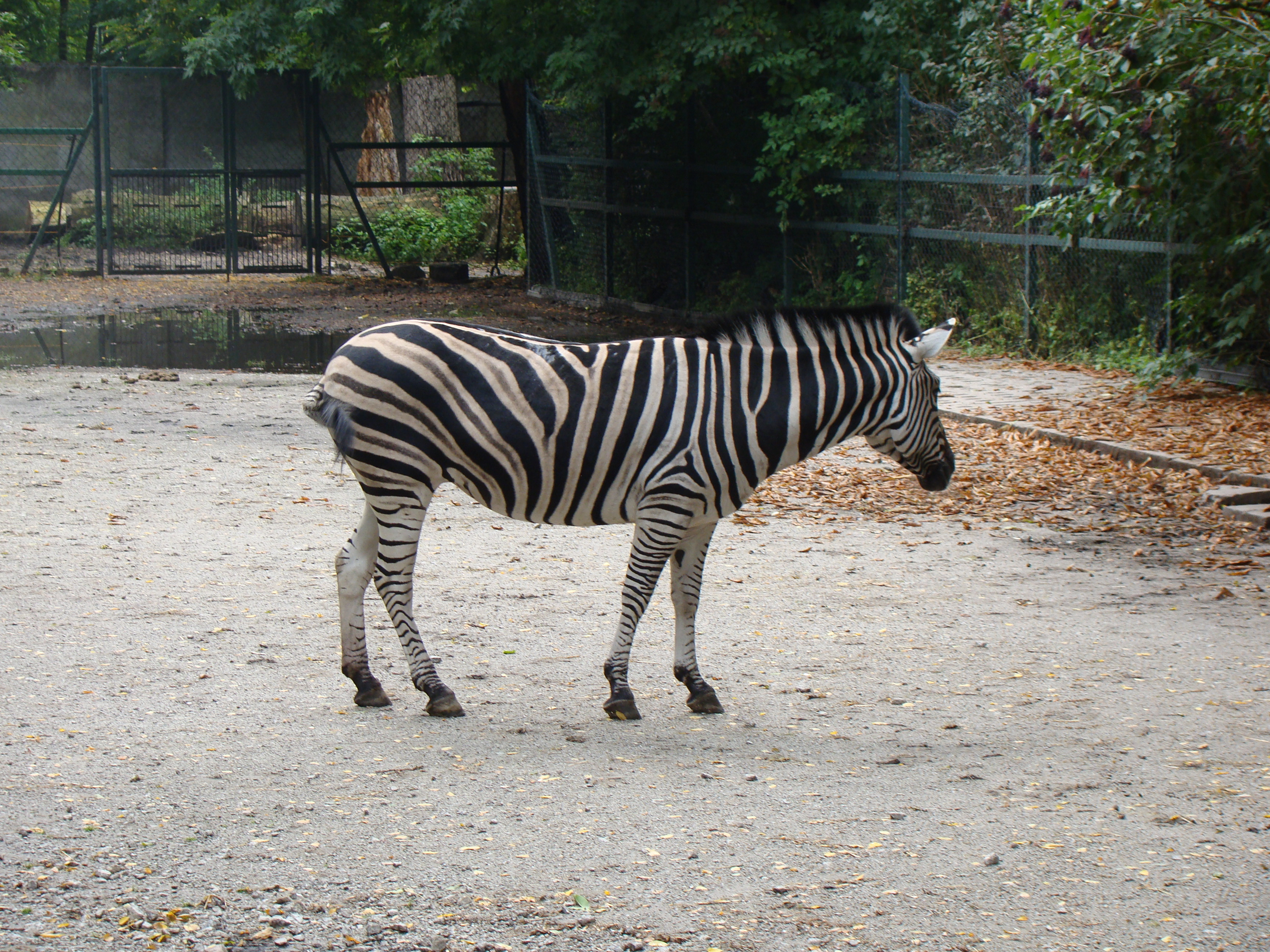
Chapman's zebra

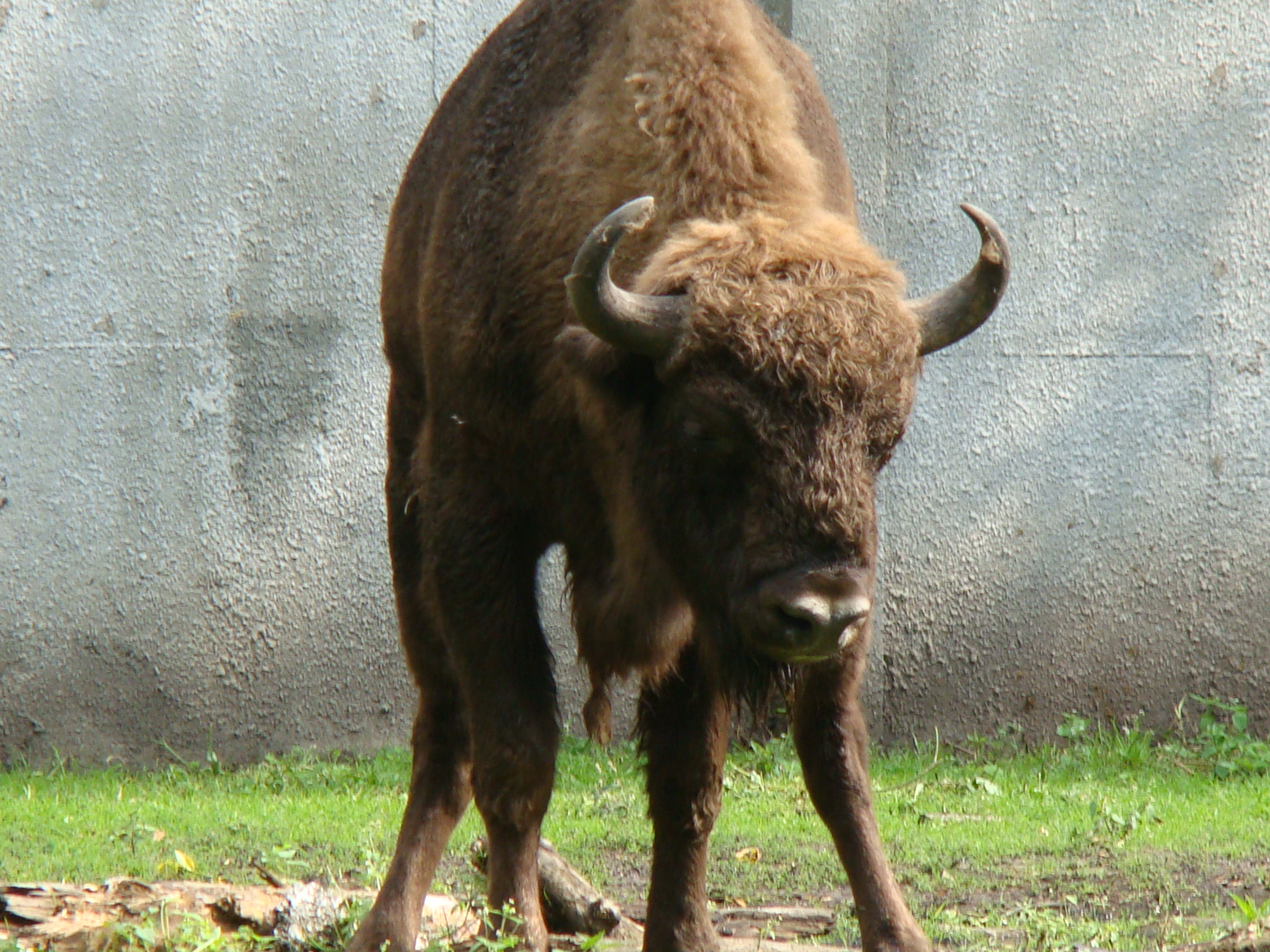
European bison

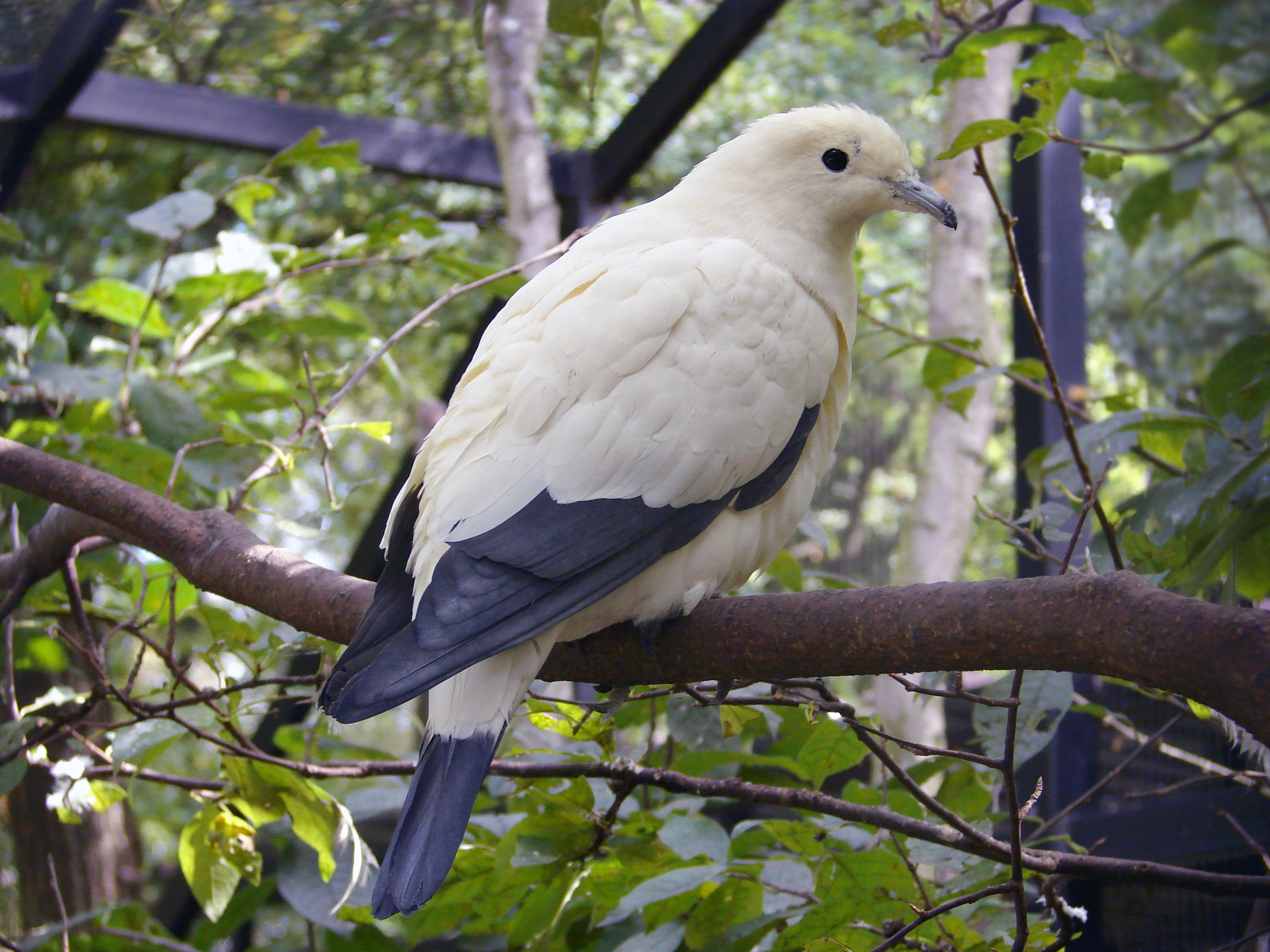
Pied imperial pigeon

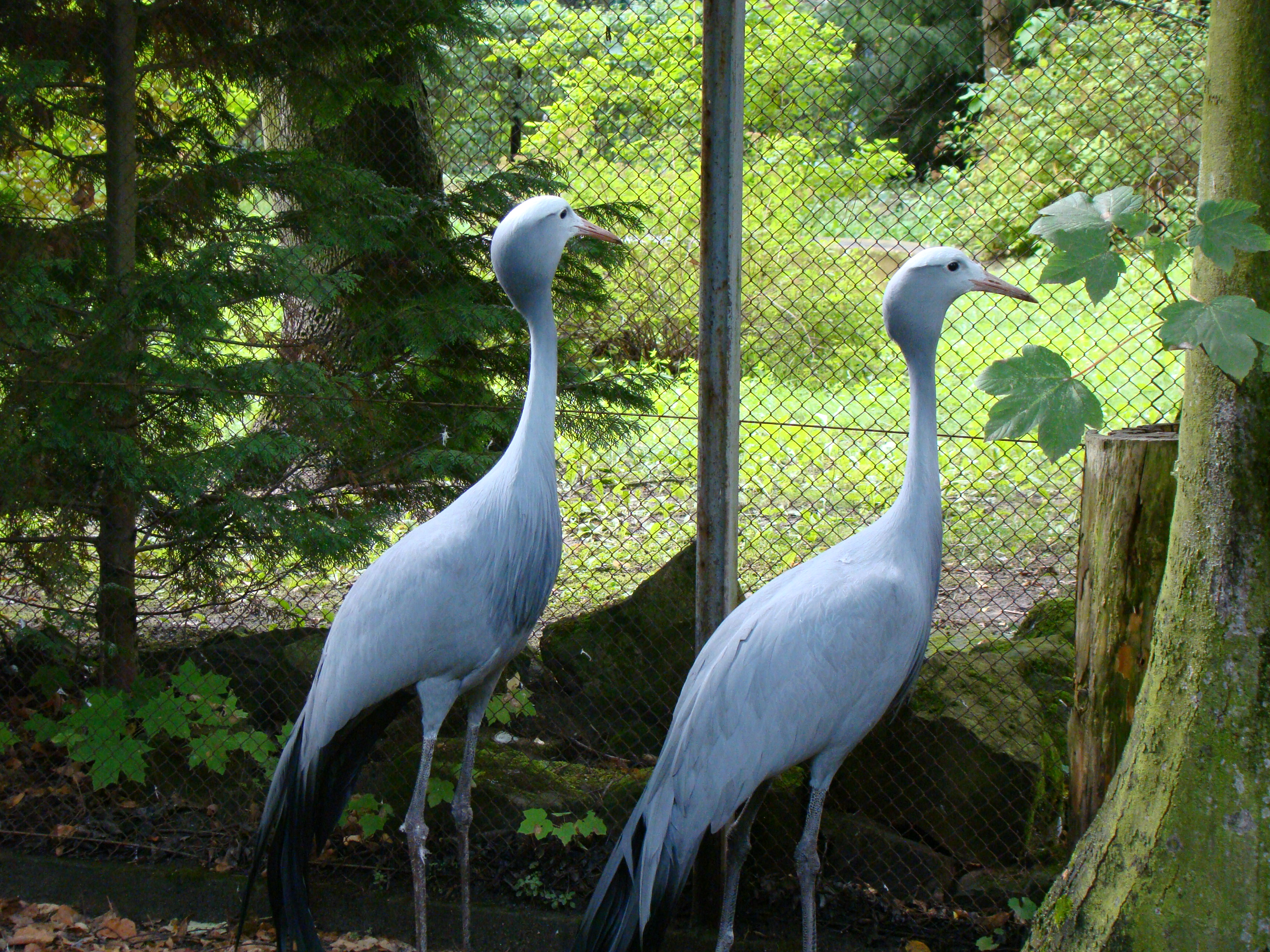
Blue cranes

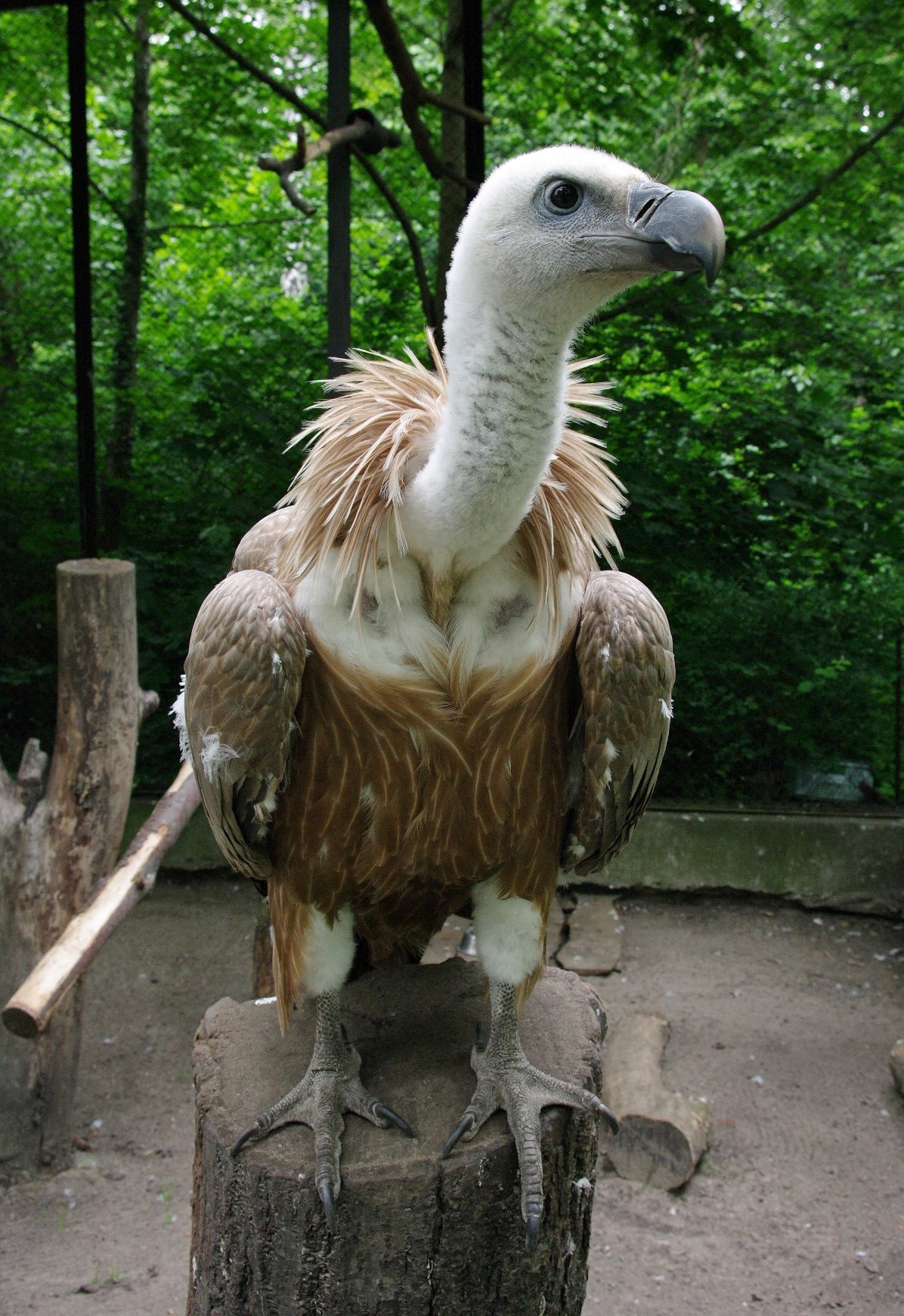
Griffon vulture

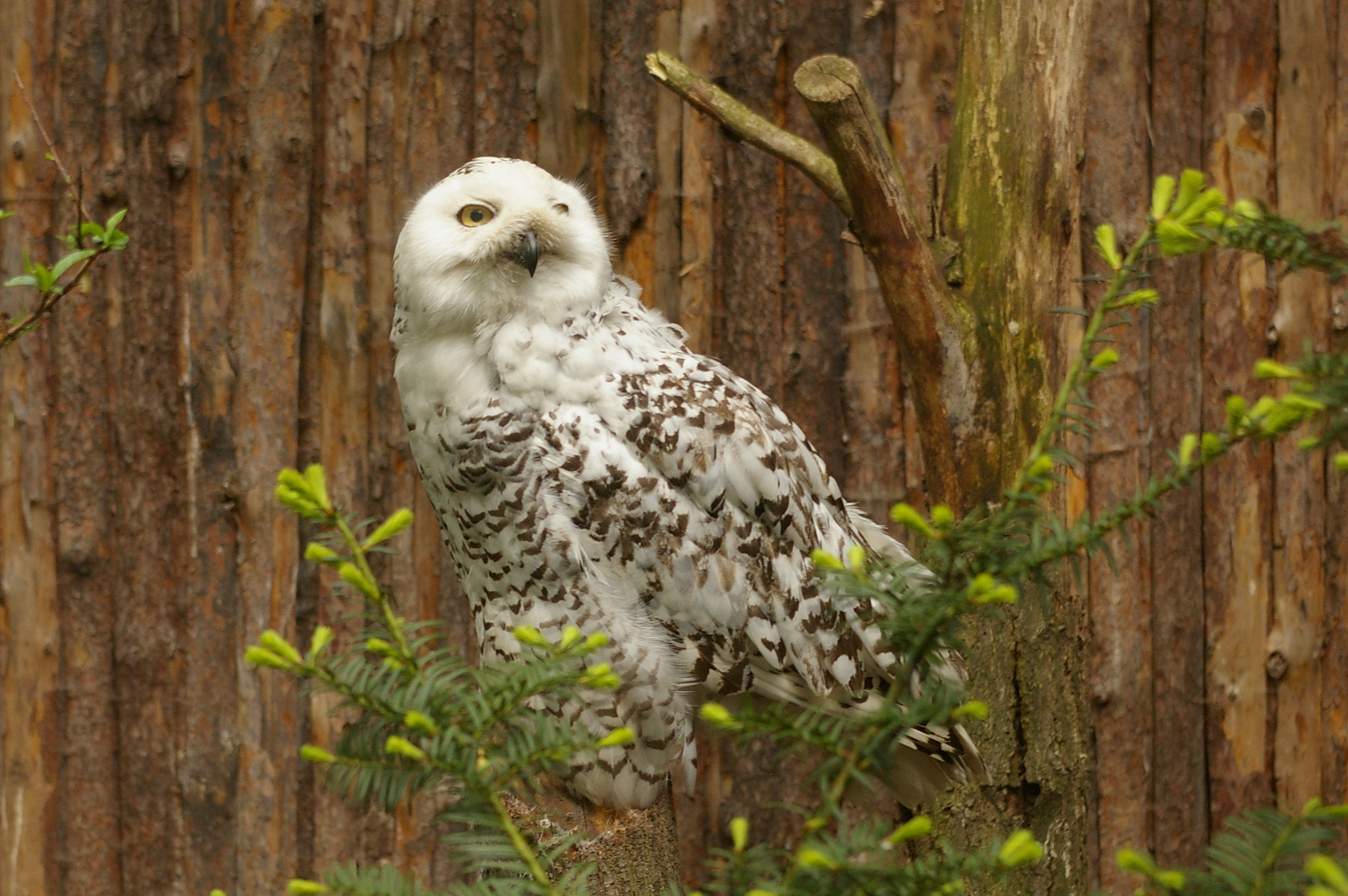
Snowy owl

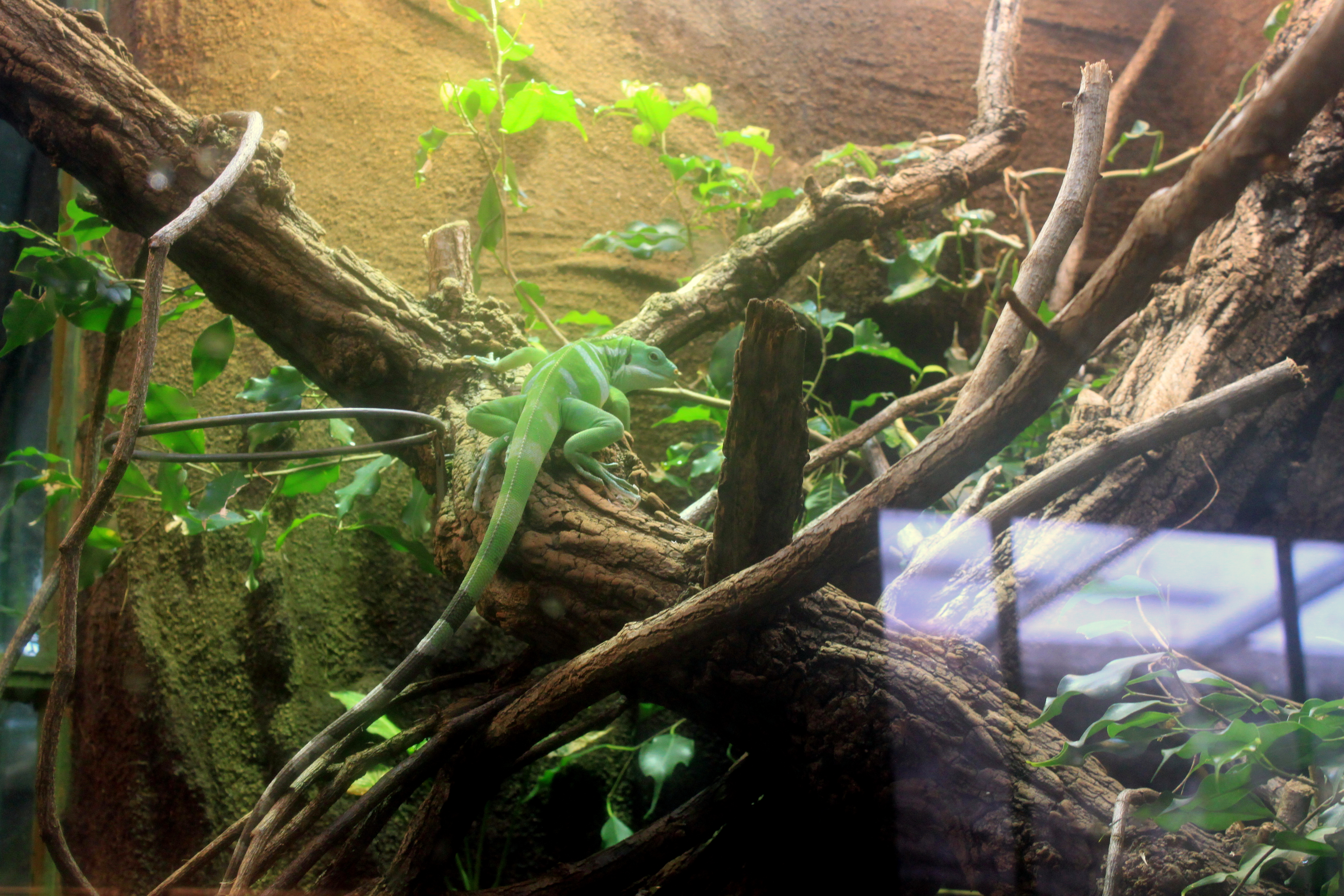
Fiji banded iguana

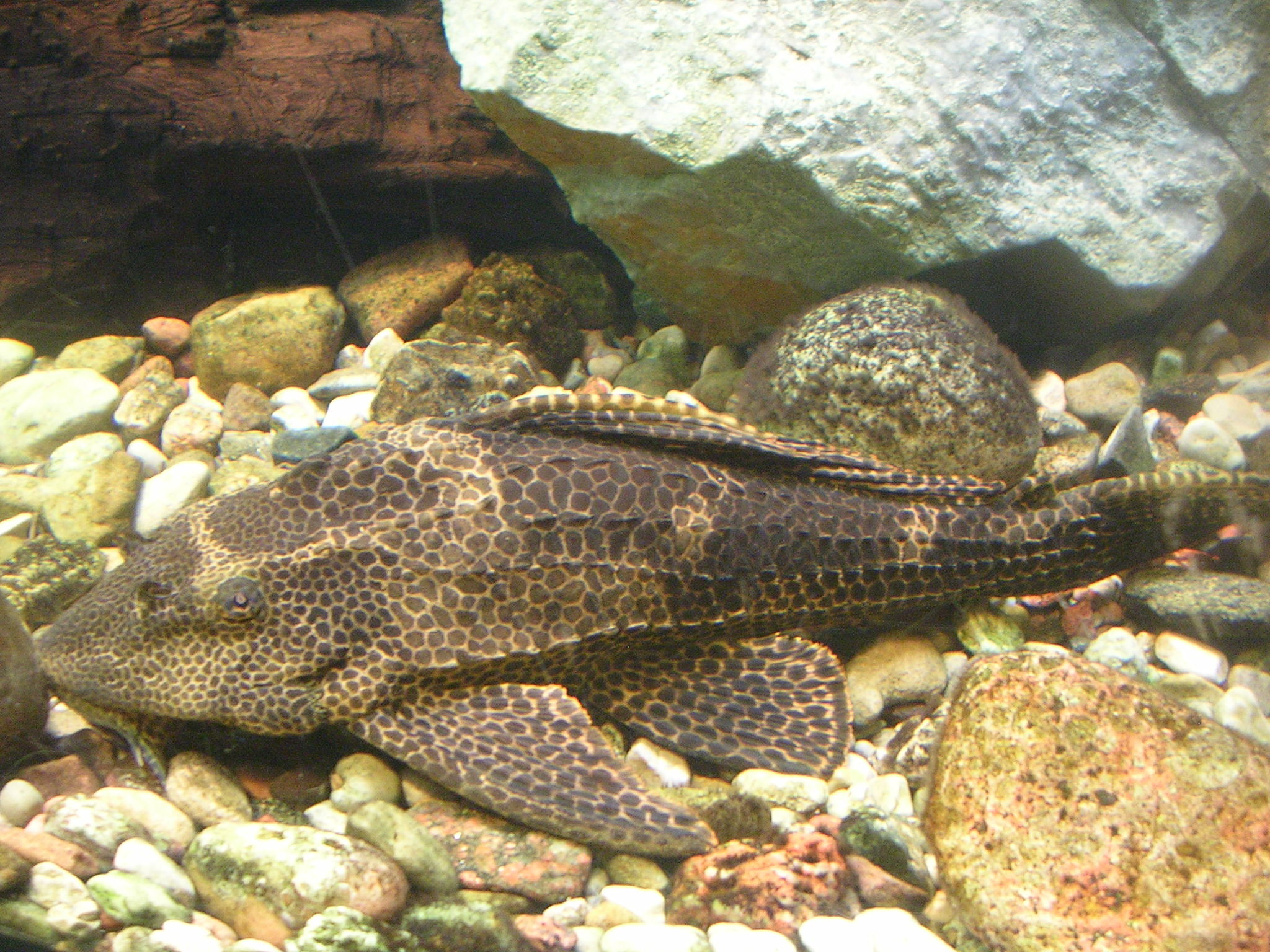
Armoured catfish

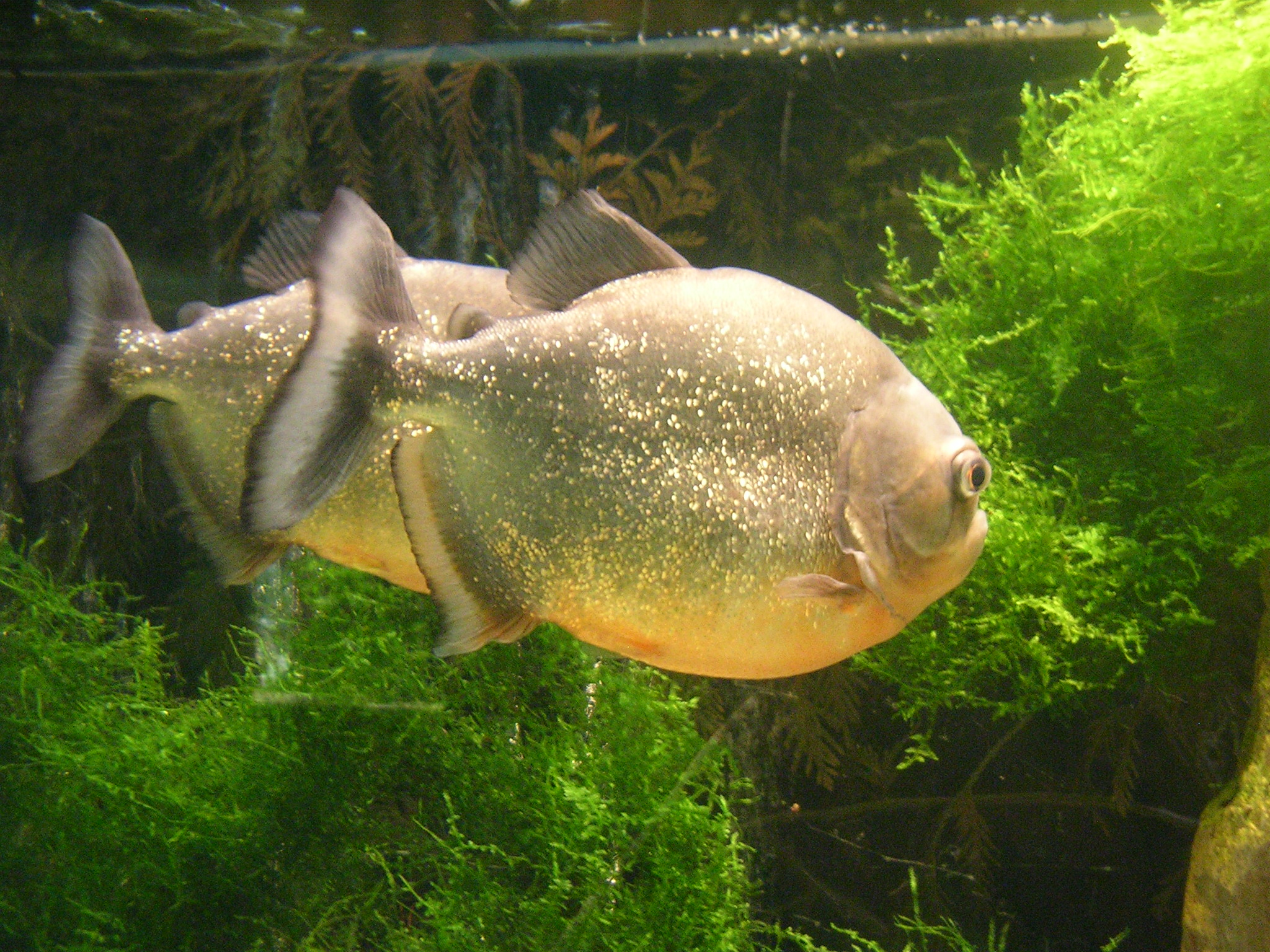
Piranhas
