= SARP Honorary Award =

Architecture prize

- Awarded for: A lifetime achievement in the art of architecture
- Sponsored by: Association of Polish Architects
- Country: Poland
- First award: 1966
- Website: www.sarp.org.pl

The SARP Honorary Award (Polish: Honorowa Nagroda SARP) is one of the two most prominent and significant annual architectural prizes in Poland, and it's awarded by the Association of Polish Architects (SARP) in recognition of the outstanding lifetime achievements in the field of architecture. It has been acclaimed 'the most prestigious architecture award' by Polish daily Gazeta Wyborcza and by Art & business: gazeta aukcyjna.

It was founded in 1966 and, since then, awarded to a number of Poland's best contemporary architects, amongst them: Marek Budzyński, Stanisław Niemczyk, Ryszard Jurkowski, Stefan Kuryłowicz and Maciej Miłobędzki.

== Laureates ==
=== 1966-1980 ===
- 1966 – Romuald Gutt
- 1967 – Jan Chmielewski
- 1968 – Wacław Kłyszewski, Jerzy Mokrzyński, Eugeniusz Wierzbicki
- 1969 – Zbigniew Ihnatowicz
- 1970 – Władysław Czarnecki
- 1971 – Jan Zachwatowicz
- 1972 – Zbigniew Karpiński, Włodzimierz Gruszczyński
- 1973 – Julian Duchowicz, Zygmunt Majerski
- 1974 – Jadwiga Grabowska-Hawrylak
- 1975 – Henryk Buszko, Aleksander Franta
- 1976 – Jan Bogusławski
- 1977 – Jerzy Hryniewiecki
- 1978 – Halina Skibniewska
- 1979 – Tadeusz Bogdan Zieliński
- 1980 – Witold Cęckiewicz

=== 1981-2000 ===
- 1981 – Bolesław Szmidt
- 1982 – Hanna Adamczewska-Wejchert, Kazimierz Wejchert
- 1983 – Piotr Biegański
- 1984 – Bohdan Lachert
- 1985 – Tadeusz Barucki
- 1986 – Tadeusz Zipser
- 1987 – Małgorzata Handzelewicz-Wacławek, Zbigniew Wacławek
- 1988 – Maciej Krasiński
- 1989 – Maciej Gintowt
- 1990 – Witold Korski
- 1991 – Szczepan Baum
- 1992 – Andrzej Jagodziński, Bogdan Krzyżanowski, Jerzy Szczepański
- 1993 – Marek Budzyński
- 1994 – Romuald Loegler
- 1995 – Konrad Kucza-Kuczyński
- 1996 – Stanisław Niemczyk
- 1997 – Andrzej Kiciński
- 1998 – Wojciech Obtułowicz
- 1999 – Ryszard Jurkowski
- 2000 – Stanisław Fiszer

=== 2001-present ===
- 2001 – Edmund Małachowicz
- 2002 – JEMS Architekci: Olgierd Jagiełło, Maciej Miłobędzki, Marcin Sadowski, Jerzy Szczepanik-Dzikowski
- 2003 – Stefan Kuryłowicz
- 2004 – Marek Dunikowski
- 2005 – Jerzy Skrzypczak
- 2006 – Witold Benedek, Stanisław Niewiadomski
- 2007 – Jerzy Gurawski
- 2008 – Marian Fikus
- 2009 – Krzysztof Ingarden, Jacek Ewý
- 2010 – Bolesław Stelmach
- 2011 – Dariusz Kozłowski
- 2012 – Grzegorz Stiasny, Jakub Wacławek
- 2013 – Michał Baryżewski, Zbigniew Reszka
- 2014 – Małgorzata Pizio-Domicz, Antoni Domicz
- 2015 – Andrzej Bulanda, Włodzimierz Mucha
- 2016 – Stanisław Deńko
- 2017 – Wojciech Zabłocki
- 2018 – Kazimierz Łatak, Piotr Lewicki
- 2020 – Zbigniew Maćków
- 2021 – Ewa Kuryłowicz
- 2022 – Bogdan Kulczyński

== Photo Gallery ==
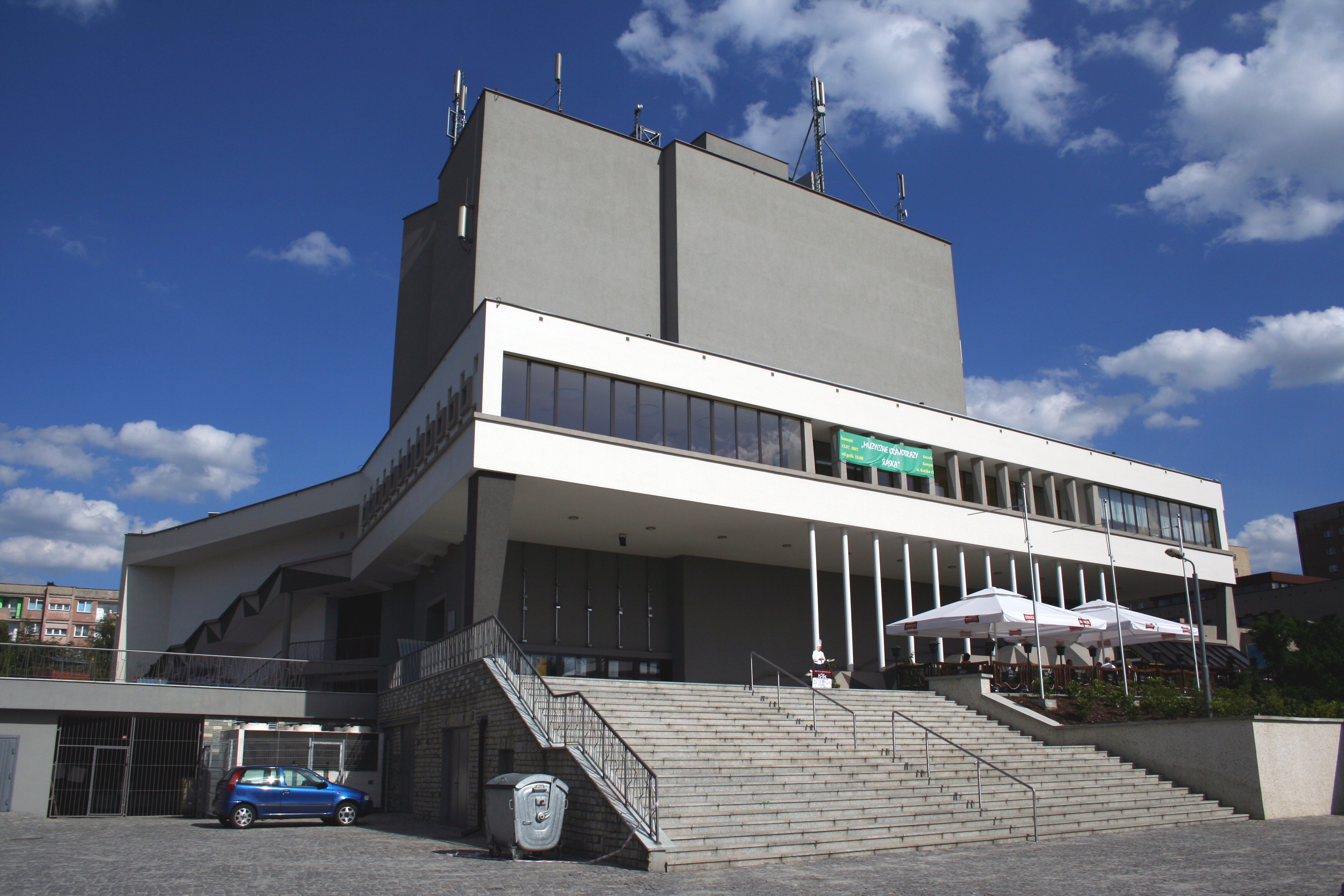
Ziemia Rybnicka Theatre, Rybnik (1964) by Henryk Buszko and Aleksander Franta

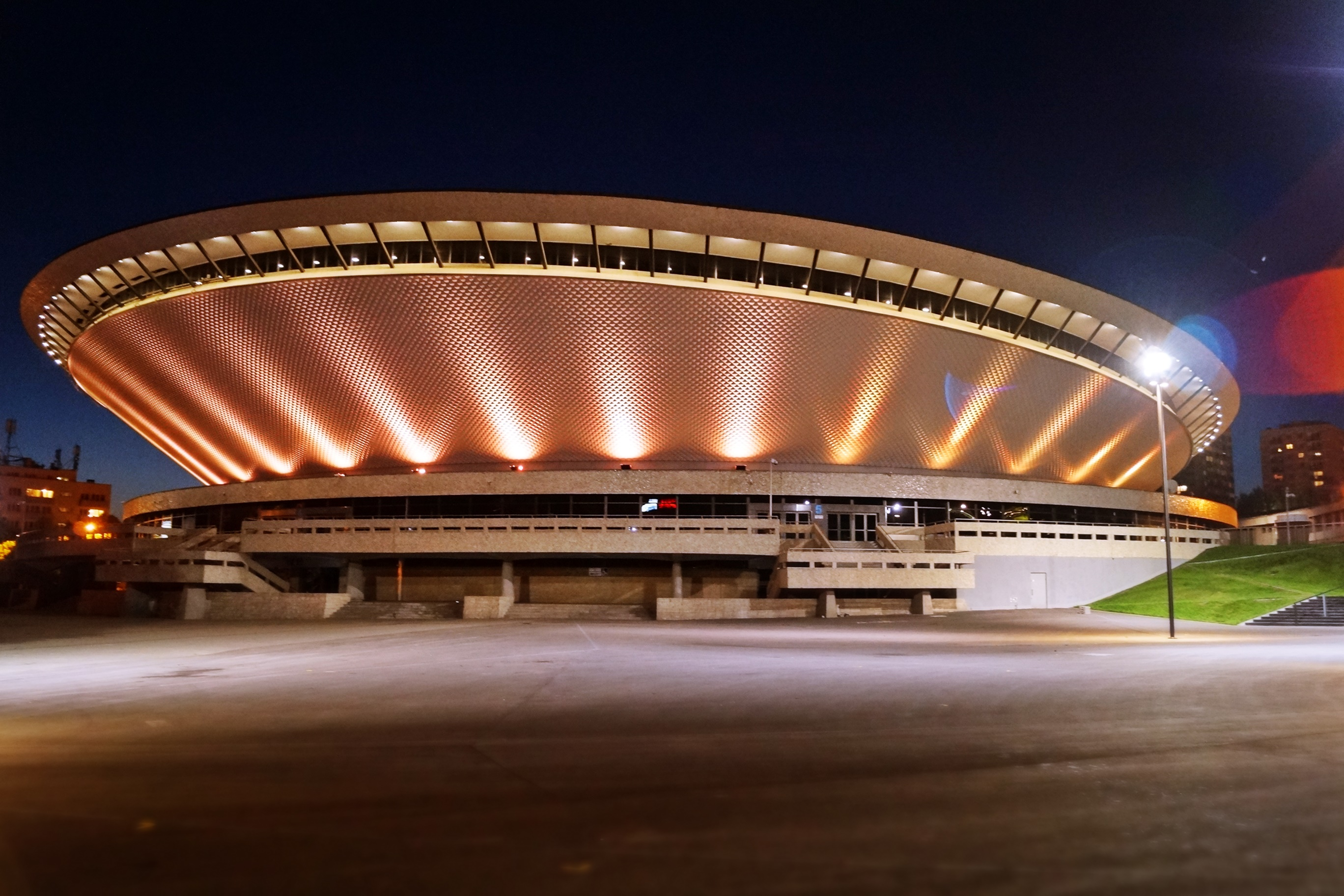
Spodek Sport and Entertainment Arena, Katowice (1971) by Maciej Gintowt

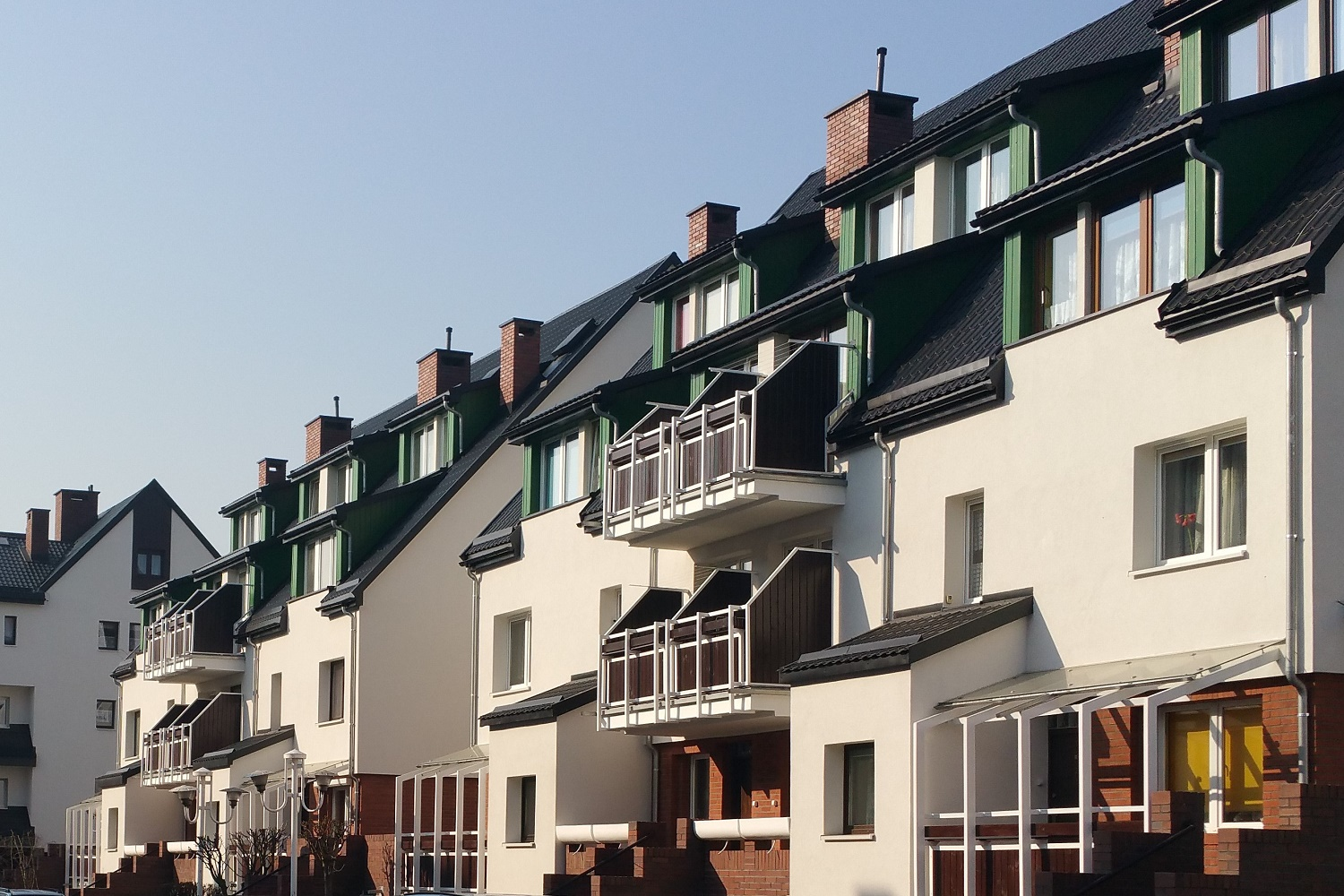
Kokociniec Residential Complex, Katowice (1985) by Ryszard Jurkowski

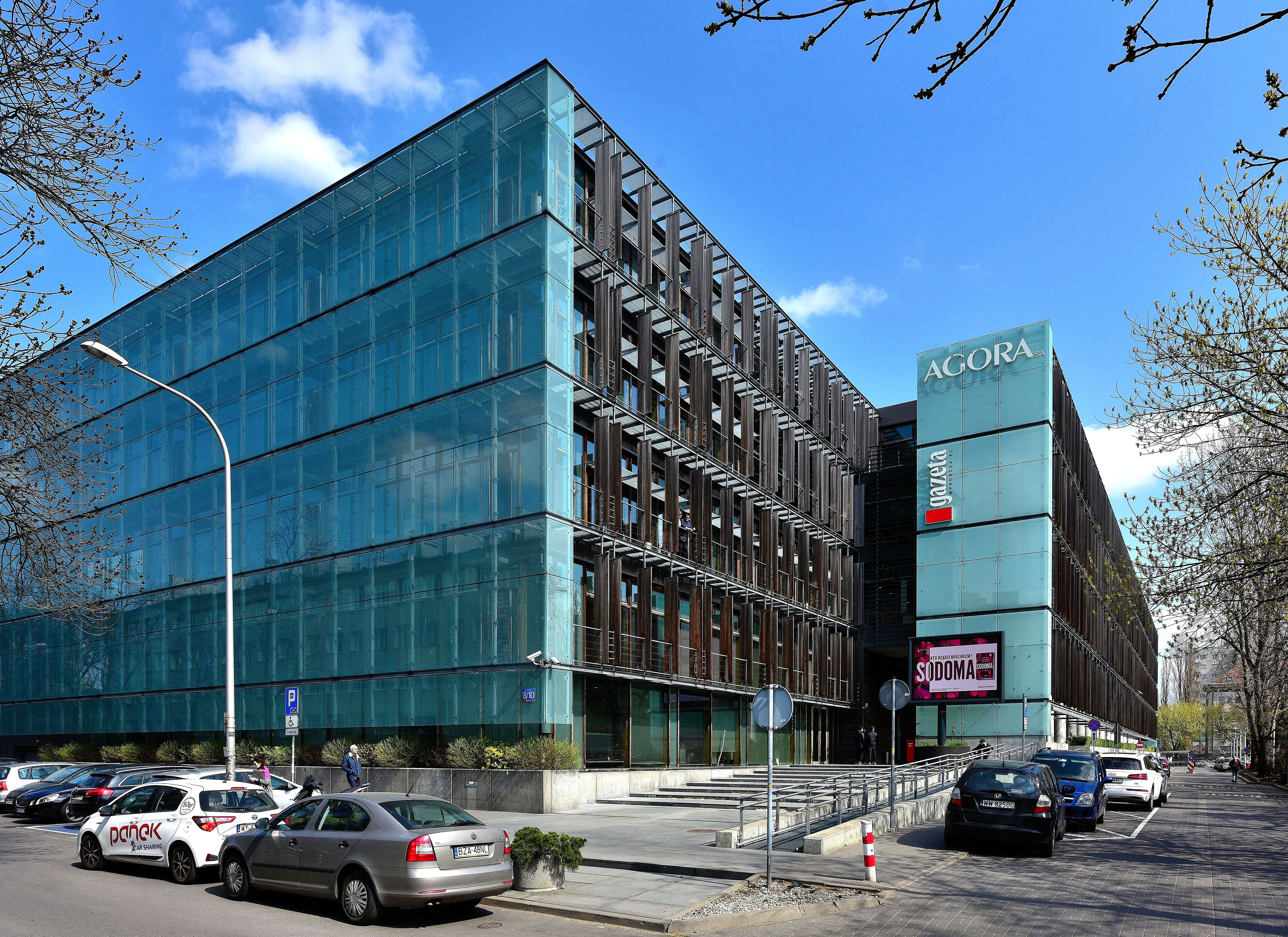
Agora SA Office Building, Warsaw (2001) by JEMS Architekci

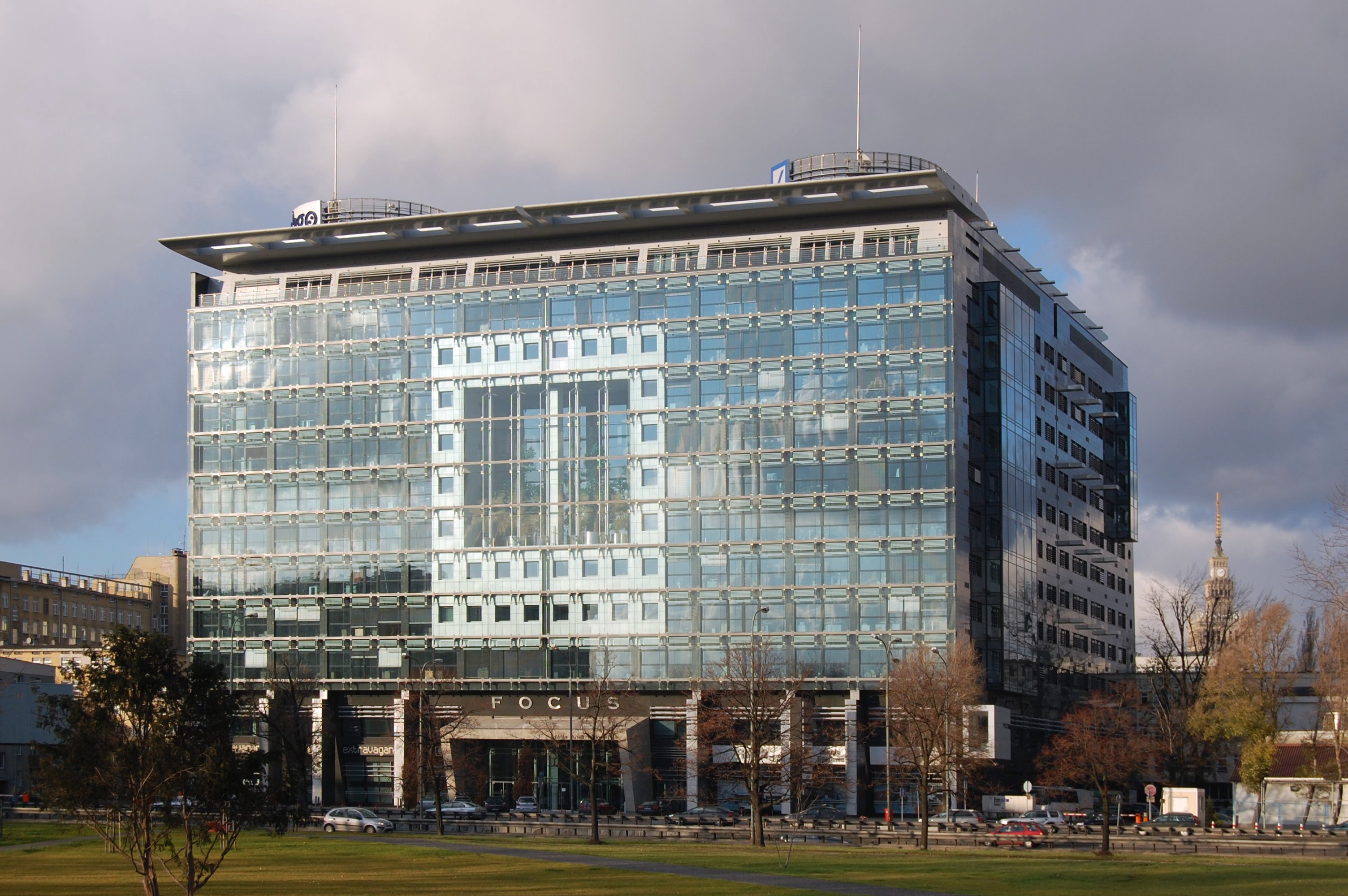
Focus Filtrowa, Warsaw (2001) by Stefan Kuryłowicz

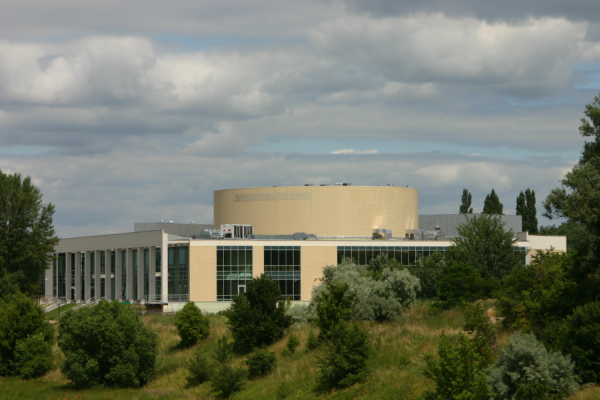
Poznan University of Technology Lecture Centre, Poznan (2004) by Marian Fikus
