= Association of Polish Architects =

Polish professional architecture organisation

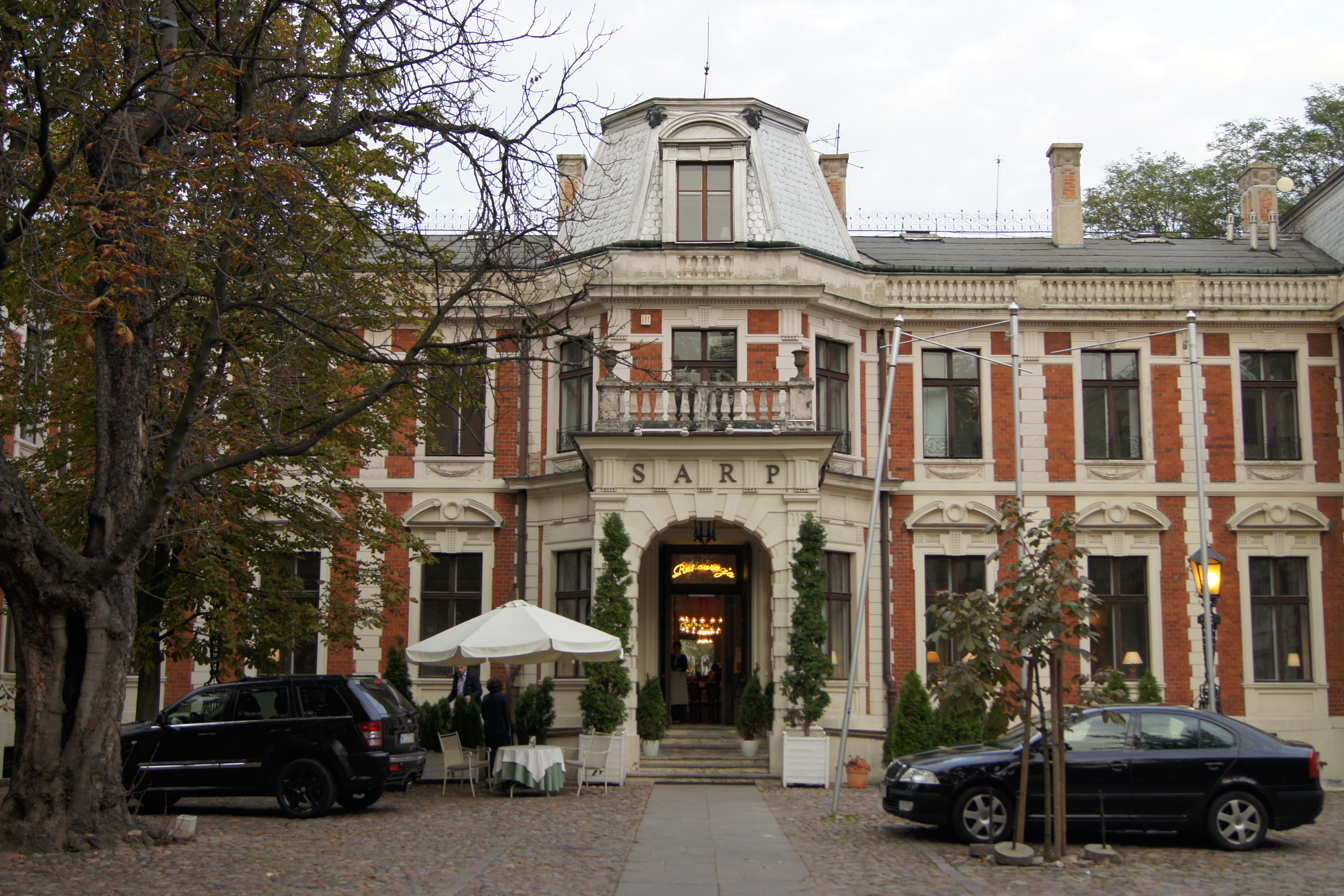
- The Konstanty Zamoyski Palace, SARP headquarters.
- Abbreviation: SARP
- Formation: July 1934
- Type: Professional organisation Copyright collective
- Purpose: Promoting architecture
- Headquarters: ul.Foksal 2, Warsaw
- Location: Poland
- President: Marek Chrobak
- Website: www.sarp.org.pl

The Association of Polish Architects (Polish: Stowarzyszenie Architektów Polskich, SARP) is a Polish professional architecture organisation. Since 1948 it has been a member of the International Union of Architects (UIA) and the International Federation of Landscape Architects (IFLA). It also acts as a publishing institution of architectural journals, books and magazines. Since 1995, it has held status of a copyright collective.

The organisation's headquarters are located at the Konstanty Zamoyski Palace in Warsaw, but it also has 25 local branches across Poland, amongst them in Katowice, Kraków, Wrocław, Poznań and Opole.

== History ==
The Association of Polish Architects was established in 1934, but traces its history to earlier institutions, such as the Krakow Technological Association (1877) and the Polish Architects' Delegation (1908). It is a merger of the Polish Architects Association, established in Warsaw in 1926, and the Union of Polish Architects' Associations, established in Poznań in 1929. In 1938, an Aryan paragraph was introduced into SARP, under which Jewish architects were expelled from the organisation a year later (56 from the Warsaw branch and 14 from the Łódź branch). SARP’s official activities were interrupted by the outbreak of the Second World War. The organisation was reactivated in 1944.

== Main activities ==
- investing, and establishing the ultimate conditions for the development of architectural creativity and its protection,
- supervising the quality of Poland's built (architecture, urban planning, landscape architecture) and natural environment,
- organising cultural, scientific and educational exhibitions, as well as architectural competitions.

== Recent Presidents ==
- Zbigniew Zawistowski 1981 - 1985
- Roman Hordyński 1985 - 1986 (until his death)
- Andrzej Kiciński 1986 - 1988
- Ryszard Semka 1988- 1994
- Krzysztof Chwalibóg 1991 - 2000
- Ryszard Jurkowski 2000 - 2006
- Jerzy Grochulski 2006 - 2012
- Mariusz Ścisło 2012 – 2019
- Bohdan Lisowski 2019 – 2022
- Jerzy Grochulski 2022 in lieu
- Agnieszka Kalinowska-Sołtys 2022 – 2024
- Marek Chrobak 2024 – present

== Awards ==
The SARP Honorary Award and the SARP Award of the Year are the two most significant and prestigious Poland's annual architectural prizes. The former is awarded in the recognition of the outstanding lifetime achievements in the field of architecture, and the latter to the designers of most significant contemporary buildings

== Publishing ==
The Association of Polish Architects is a publisher of architectural journals and magazines, such as the ARCH Magazine, Biuletyn and the Komunikat SARP. In 2018 it published On Adam's House in Paradise (pol. O rajskim domu Adama), a book by the RIBA Royal Gold Medal winner, architect and historian Professor Joseph Rykwert.

== See also ==
- International Biennale of Architecture in Kraków
