= Marian Fikus =

Polish architect, urban planner and professor

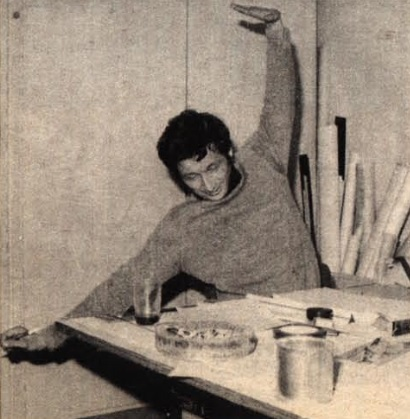
- Marian Fikus in 1982
- Born: October 16, 1938 (age 87); Kobiór, Poland
- Education: Faculty of Architecture, University of Essex
- Occupation: Architect
- Practice: Studio Fikus

Marian Fikus (born October 14, 1938, in Kobiór) is a Polish architect, urban planner and post-doctoral degree. Winner of over 100 awards and honors in urban planning and architectural competitions, including 5 awards in international competitions. He's also the winner of the SARP Honorary Award in 2008.

In 1968, Fikus with Jerzy Gurawski founded the Studio F-G and in 1988, he created the Studio Fikus with his wife Elżbieta Kosińska-Fikus.
