= SARP Award of the Year =

Polish architectural prize

- Awarded for: Most significant contemporary buildings in Poland.
- Country: Poland
- Presented by: Association of Polish Architects
- First award: 1983; 43 years ago
- Final award: 2023
- Website: www.sarp.pl

The SARP Award of the Year (Polish: Nagroda Roku SARP) is a Polish architecture prize established in 1983. It is awarded by the Association of Polish Architects (SARP) to the designers of the most significant contemporary buildings, and it's carried out under the honourable patronage of the Ministry of Culture and National Heritage.

Considered the most important architecture prize in Poland, it is awarded to the individual architects, as well as to the local SARP branches, architectural practices and design studios, public administration bodies, and the authorised by the project leaders architectural editorial offices.

== Winners ==
Year	Office	Building		Site	Ref.
1983	Stanisław Niemczyk		Holy Ghost Sacral Complex in Nowe Tychy-Żwakowo	Tychy	
1984	Jadwiga Grabowska-Hawrylak		Private house at ul. Kochanowskiego 84 i 84a	Wrocław	
1985	Jerzy Rak, Janusz Grzegorzak		ZMW Building	Opole	
1993	Kuryłowicz&Associates		Fuji Film Polska office building	Warsaw	
1995	Marek Dunikowski, Artur Jasiński, Jarosław Kutniowski, Piotr Uherek		Krakchemia Shopping Mall	Kraków	
1996	Kuryłowicz&Associates		Acron Industrial Service Corporation	Warsaw	
1998	Jednacz Malanczowski Architekci		Seat of the Stefan Batory Foundation	Warsaw	
1999	Andrzej Kiciński		Szara Willa	Warsaw	
2000	Bulanda & Mucha Architects		Bank BRE	Bydgoszcz	
2000	Marek Budzyński, Zbigniew Badowski		Supreme Court of Poland	Warsaw	
2002	Bulanda & Mucha Architects		The Old Paper Mill	Konstancin-Jeziorna	
2003	nsMoonStudio	–	The Shingle House	Kraków	
2004	Stelmach i Partnerzy		Hydrotherapy Centre	Nałęczów	
2005	Krzysztof Ingarden of Ingarden & Ewý Architekci in collaboration with Aleksander Janicki		The Polish Pavilion - Expo 2005	Aichi, Japan	
2006	Goczołowie Architekci and OVO Grąbczewscy Architekci		Paleontologic Pavilion	Krasiejów	
2007	Konior Studio		The Science and Music Education Centre „Symfonia”	Katowice	
2008	db2 architekci	–	Opole Village Museum	Opole	
2009	Maćków Pracownia Projektowa		Renoma	Wrocław	
2010	Ryszard Jurkowski of AiR Jurkowscy Architekci		Książęce Residential Complex	Katowice	
2011	Palk Architekci	–	Geoeducation Centre	Kielce	
2012	DDJM		Krzysztof Penderecki European Music Centre	Lusławice	
2013	Lahdelma & Mahlamäki Architects and Kuryłowicz & Associates		POLIN Museum of the History of Polish Jews	Warsaw	
2014	IQ2 Konsorcjum (nsMoonStudio, Wizja)		Cricoteka	Kraków	
2015	JEMS Architects		International Congress Center	Katowice	
2016	Stelmach i Partnerzy Biuro Architektoniczne		The Meeting of Cultures Centre	Lublin	
2017	Grupa 5 Architekci, Bass Arquitectes and Małeccy Biuro		Silesian University Faculty of Radio and Television	Katowice	
2018	Biuro Projektów Lewicki Łatak	–	Cracovia 1906 Sports Club with the Disabled Persons' Centre	Kraków	
2019	KWK Promes		Unikato residential building	Katowice	
2020	Biuro Projektów Lewicki Łatak		Modernization of the Czartoryski Museum	Kraków	
2021	JEMS Architekci		Browary Warszawskie	Warsaw	
2022	SLAS architekci		Extension of the Józef Świder School of Music	Jastrzębie-Zdrój	
2023	Szlachcic Architekci		Orientarium ZOO Łódź	Łódź	

== See also ==
- Architecture of Poland
- List of architecture prizes
