= JEMS Architekci =

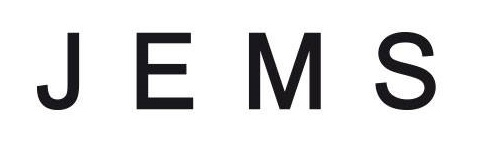

Practice information
- Key architects: Olgierd Jagiełło, Maciej Miłobędzki, Jerzy Szczepanik-Dzikowski, Marcin Sadowski, Marek Moskal, Paweł Majkusiak and Andrzej Sidorowicz
- Founded: 1988; 38 years ago

Significant works and honors
- Awards: SARP Honorary Award (2002)

Website
- www.jems.pl

JEMS Architekci is an architectural firm based in Warsaw, Poland.

It was officially established in 1988 by Olgierd Jagiełło, Maciej Miłobędzki, Jerzy Szczepanik-Dzikowski and Wojciech Zych (an economist and the CEO of JEMS) who had worked together a few years earlier within Spółdzielnia Pracy Twórczej Architektów i Plastyków ESPEA (lit. Cooperative for Creative Work of Architects and Artists). In the following years Marcin Sadowski, Marek Moskal, Paweł Majkusiak and Andrzej Sidorowicz joined the team.

Among their best-known designs are the Hoover Square in Warsaw (2012), the Polish Embassy in Berlin (2012) and the Raczyński Library in Poznań (2014). In 2015 they won the SARP Award of the Year for their design for the International Conference Centre in Katowice.

== Selected awards ==
- "Polityka" magazine Architectural Award (2016) – International Congress Center in Katowice
- SARP Award of the Year 2015 – International Congress Centre in Katowice
- SARP Honorary Award (2002) to JEMS Architekci team: Olgierd Jagiełło, Maciej Miłobędzki, Jerzy Szczepanik-Dzikowski and Marcin Sadowski
