= SoftBank Vision Fund =

Venture capital fund

Vision Fund

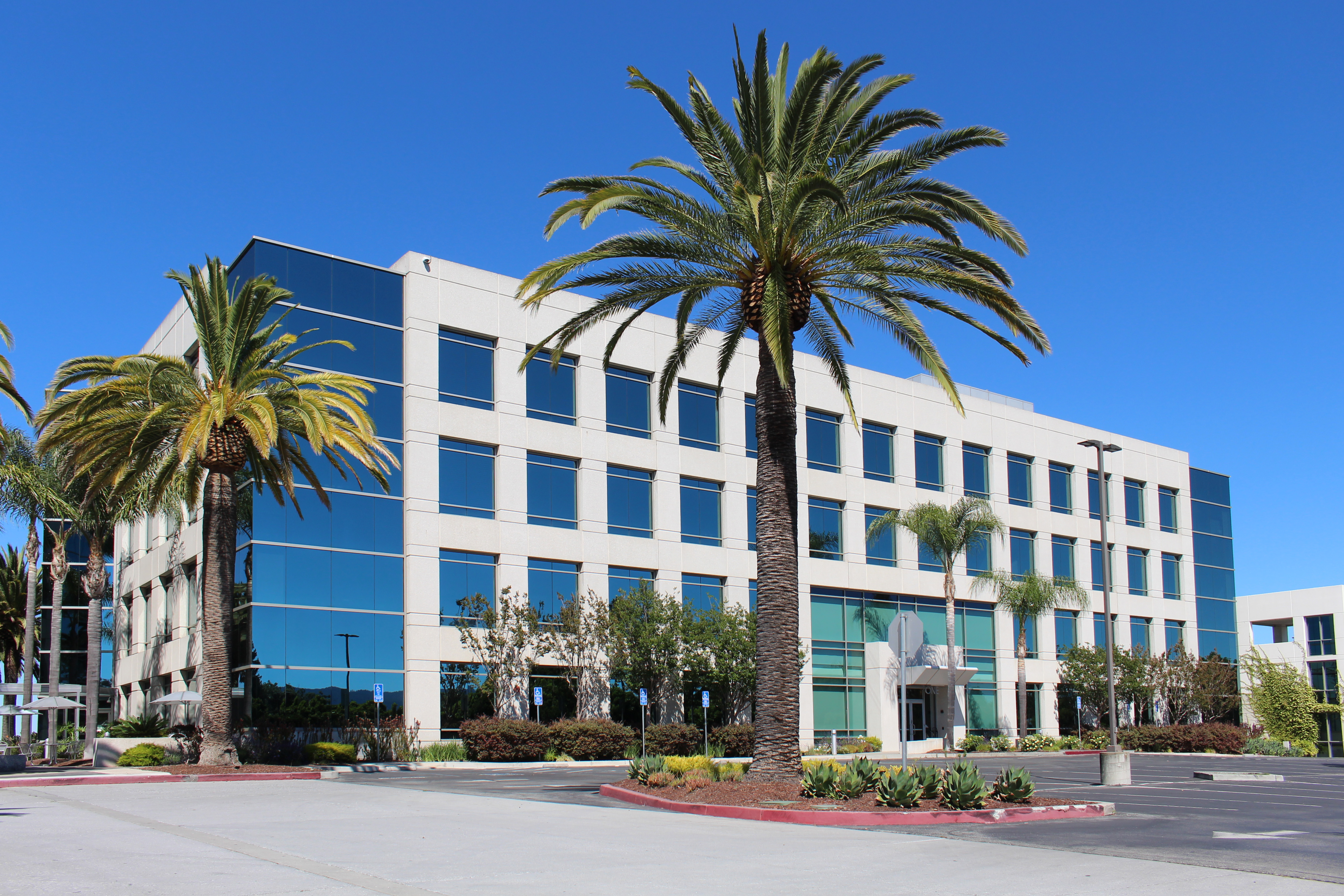
- Former Silicon Valley office location in San Carlos, California (since moved to Palo Alto, California)
- Type: Private
- Industry: Venture Capital
- Founded: 2017; 9 years ago
- Founder: Masayoshi Son
- Headquarters: London, England
- Key people: Masayoshi Son (chairman); Alex Clavel (CEO)
- Products: Investments
- AUM: $134 billion (June 2023)
- Parent: SoftBank Group
- Website: www.visionfund.com

The Vision Fund is a venture capital fund founded in 2017. It is managed by SoftBank Investment Advisers, a subsidiary of the SoftBank Group. With over $100 billion in capital, it is the world's largest technology-focused investment fund. In 2019, SoftBank Vision Fund 2 was founded.

== History ==
The Softbank Vision Fund was created in May 2017 by the SoftBank Group and the Public Investment Fund (PIF). $100 billion was raised with PIF contributing $45 billion, SoftBank contributing $28 billion, the Mubadala Investment Company contributing $15 billion and the rest from other investors including Apple. Through Softbank Vision Fund, Masayoshi Son explained his intent to invest in all companies developing technologies in line with the global artificial intelligence trends, including various sectors such as finance or transportation. The project was internally codenamed "Project Crystal Ball".

As of early February 2019, the Vision Fund had built up a 4.9% position in Nvidia stock, and then was forced to sell all those shares when a prolonged plunge in Nvidia's stock price threatened to endanger the fund's overall performance. Over a six-month period, the fund had set up a collar strategy around its Nvidia stock, thereby protecting itself from a severe price drop which began in October 2018 but also limiting its ability to profit from any rise in Nvidia's stock price. At the time, the Vision Fund recorded a $3.3 billion return on its Nvidia investment. The fund's February 2019 closeout of its Nvidia position preceded the AI boom and Nvidia's rapid transformation into one of the world's most valuable companies. By June 2024, the market value of those shares had exceeded $150 billion, causing Son to publicly remark that "the fish that got away was big".

In January 2020, multiple Softbank-funded startups started cutting their staff, such as at Getaround, Oyo, Rappi, Katerra and Zume. In February 2020, Elliott Management, an activist hedge fund, bought a $2.5 billion stake in Softbank and pushed for restructuration and more transparency, especially regarding its Vision Fund. With many portfolio companies of the first fund not performing well and high profile debacles such as the buyout of WeWork after its failed Initial public offering, investor confidence in the Vision Fund fell. In May 2020, Softbank announced the Vision Fund lost $18 billion leading to 15% of the fund's 500 staff being laid off. As a result, the Vision Fund 2 raised less than half of its $108 billion goal with all of it being funded by Softbank itself after failure to secure commitments from external investors.

In May 2021, SoftBank announced the total fair value of both funds as of 31 March 2021 was $154 billion and the Vision Funds made a record profit of $36.99 billion due to its successful investment in Coupang. After announcing the success, SoftBank raised the size of Vision Fund 2 to $30 billion and stated it plans to continue self funding the second fund although it might consider trying again to secure funding from external investors. Also in May 2021, Bloomberg reported that Vision Fund could become public through a $300 million SPAC in 2021, listing in Amsterdam.

In 2022, SoftBank Vision Fund posted a record 3.5 trillion yen loss ($27.4 billion) for its financial year ended on 31 March 2022 as the valuation of its stock portfolio plummeted. The fund's losing investments were massive and both Son, who had claimed he had a special ability to see the future of disruptive entrepreneurship, and SoftBank, received much criticism from shareholders, peers and the business and finance media in general due to the magnitude of the failure.

Failed investments include Katerra, Wirecard and Zymergen and have led to criticisms of the Vision Fund for insufficient due diligence.

In July 2022, CEO Rajeev Misra announced he would be stepping back from some of his main roles including the management of SoftBank Vision Fund 2. Several other executives stepped down from their roles in the same year.

In August 2022, the Vision fund announced a loss of $23.1 billion for the April–June quarter and that it would be planning to cut headcounts. Eric J. Savitz, associate editor for technology at Barron's, characterized the SoftBank Vision Fund as a failed experiment. Masayoshi Son said at the time he was "embarrassed" and "ashamed" when he was confronted with SoftBank Vision Fund's dismal performance and The Wall Street Journal called SoftBank a "big loser" while Bloomberg elaborated on "Masayoshi Son’s broken business model." Son's investing strategy in the first and second SoftBank Vision Funds established in 2017 and 2019, was being described as one reliant on the greater fool theory and the lackluster performance of its investments and Masayoshi Son's presentations in face of that, have been ridiculed by specialized media.

By early 2023, having lost its exuberance due to serious profitability issues and facing declining return on investment prospects as well as record losses, the once world's biggest investor in startups had invested just $300 million into startups in the last October–December quarter, down more than 90% from the previous year. In May 2023, the SoftBank Group disclosed that its Vision Fund lost a record $32 billion in the fiscal year ending in March 2023.

In November 2024, Misra formally stepped down from his role in managing the Vision Fund and will be succeeded by Alex Clavel.

== Business overview ==
SoftBank Vision Fund is managed by SoftBank Investment Advisers and SoftBank Vision Fund 2 is managed by SoftBank Global Advisors. Both are subsidiaries of the SoftBank Group. The firm has an investment team that will evaluate and select companies for the funds to invest in. Investments made mostly are either venture capital or private equity type ones. Most of the investments in Silicon Valley companies have been more than $100 million.

SoftBank Investment Advisers is headquartered in London with additional main offices in Silicon Valley and Tokyo. It also has other offices in Abu Dhabi, Hong Kong, Mumbai, Riyadh, Shanghai and Singapore.

== Notable investments ==
SoftBank Vision Fund's notable investments include:

- 10x Genomics
- Arm Ltd.
- Automation Anywhere
- ByteDance
- C2FO
- Chime (company)
- Cohesity
- Compass
- Coupang
- Cruise
- DiDi
- DoorDash
- eToro
- Fanatics
- Flipkart
- Flexport
- FTX
- Fungible Inc.
- Getaround
- Grab
- Improbable
- Kabbage
- Katerra
- Klarna
- Lenskart
- Mapbox
- Nuro
- Nvidia
- OneWeb
- Opendoor
- OurCrowd
- Oyo Rooms
- Ping An Good Doctor
- PolicyBazaar
- Rappi
- Revolut
- Roivant Sciences
- Slack
- Sprint Ray
- Swiggy
- The Hut Group
- Tractable (company)
- Uber
- Unacademy
- View, Inc.
- Wag
- WeWork
- ZhongAn
- Zume
- Zymergen
