= SprintRay =

American technology company

Sprint Ray
- Type: Private
- Industry: Dental technology, 3D printing
- Founded: 2014; 12 years ago
- Founders: Amir Mansouri, Jasper Jing Zhang, and Hossein Bassir
- Headquarters: Los Angeles, California, U.S.
- Key people: Erich Kreidler (President)

SprintRay Inc. is an American dental technology company headquartered in Los Angeles, California. Founded in 2014, it operates in the dental additive manufacturing sector, with a focus on 3D printing systems and materials used in clinical and laboratory dentistry.

== History ==
The company was founded by Amir Mansouri, Jasper Jing Zhang, and Hossein Bassir, following research conducted at the USC Viterbi School of Engineering.

In 2016, the company raised $500,000 through Kickstarter to fund development of its first 3D printer, the MoonRay. Although initially positioned for general prototyping, subsequent development efforts shifted toward dental applications.

In 2019, the company introduced the SprintRay Pro series of dental printers.

In 2022, it completed a $100 million Series D funding round led by SoftBank Vision Fund. In 2024, SprintRay was granted patents related to a magnetic locking system for printing platforms and a multi-stage wash process for post-processing printed parts.

In September 2025, SprintRay acquired the dental product portfolio of EnvisionTEC (ETEC) from Desktop Health.

== Material research and collaborations ==
The company's primary material for permanent restorations is a resin-based composite marketed as Ceramic Crown.

Research published in the Journal of Esthetic and Restorative Dentistry and Odontology has evaluated its mechanical performance, noting that printed resins generally exhibit a lower elastic modulus and higher surface roughness after simulated aging than traditional milled lithium disilicate blocks.

The company has also entered material validation agreements with dental manufacturers, including a collaboration with Ivoclar Group announced in 2024 and an earlier agreement with BEGO relating to ceramic-filled resins for permanent restorations.

== Legal dispute ==
In 2021, SprintRay was involved in a patent infringement suit brought by EnvisionTEC (a subsidiary of Desktop Metal) regarding the layer separation technology in its "Pro" series printers. A preliminary injunction was briefly issued in Germany prohibiting the sale of these models in that jurisdiction.

The dispute was resolved following SprintRay's acquisition of the EnvisionTEC dental portfolio in 2025.

== Recognition ==
In 2025, SprintRay was included in Fast Company's annual list of medical device companies identified for innovation.
