= PZU Tower =

Office building in Warsaw, Poland

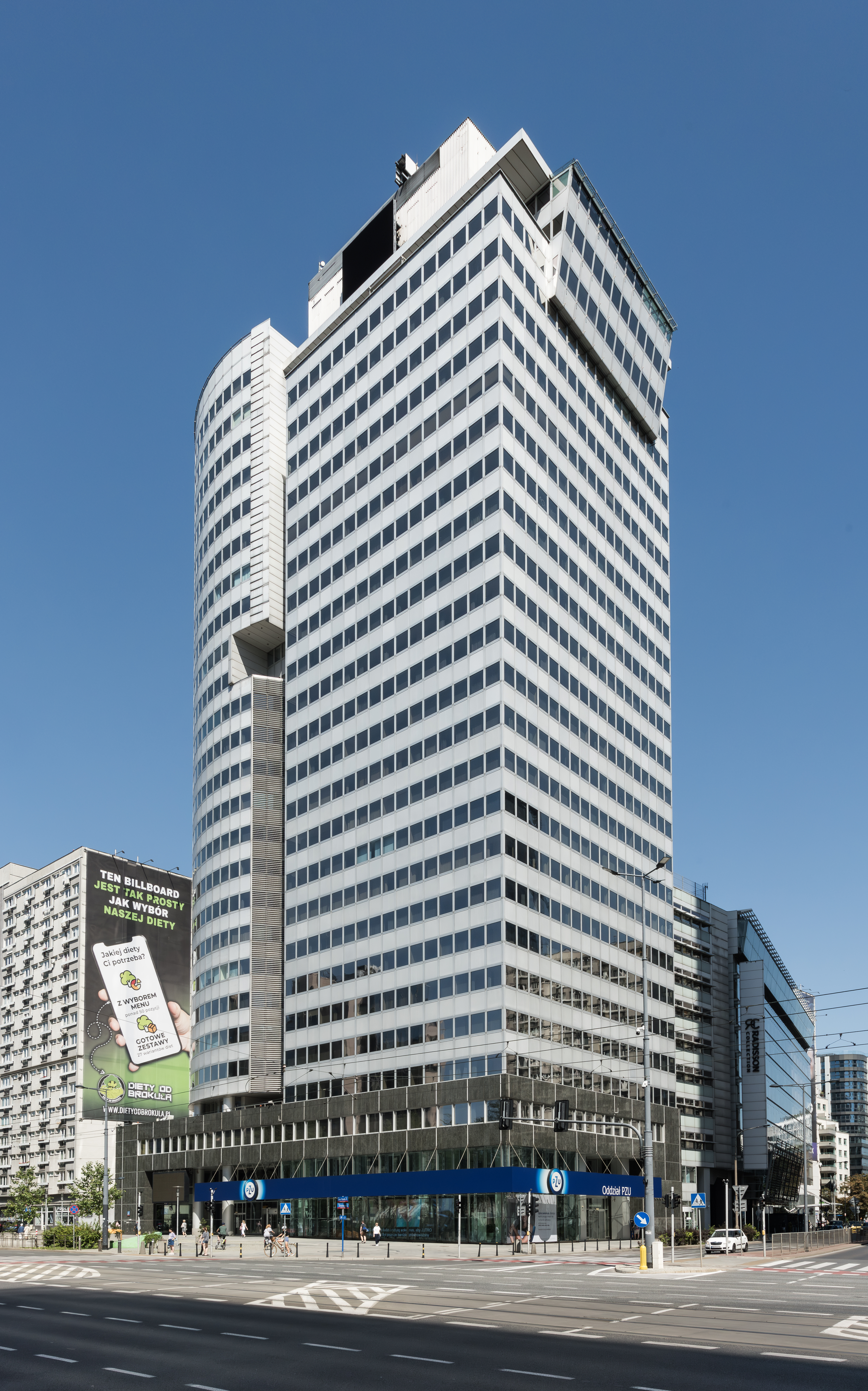
- The building in 2023.
- Interactive map of the PZU Tower area

General information
- Type: Office skyscraper
- Location: Wola, Warsaw, Poland, 24 John Paul II Avenue
- Coordinates: 52°14′11.08″N 20°59′52.71″E
- Construction started: 1997
- Completed: 2000
- Owner: Powszechny Zakład Ubezpieczeń

Height
- Tip: 94 m
- Roof: 97 m

Design and construction
- Architects: Tadeusz Spychała; Wojciech Popławski; Willibald Furst
- Architecture firm: Spychała & Partnerzy

PZU Tower is a skyscraper office building in Warsaw, Poland, within the Downtown district. It is placed at 24 John Paul II Avenue, at the corner with Grzybowska Street, within the neighbourhood of North Downtown. The building has 28 storeys, with its height to the roof measuring 94 m, and its total height to its roof being 97 m. The building was constructed between 1997 and 2000, and designed by architects Tadeusz Spychała, Wojciech Popławski, and Willibald Furst, from the architecture firm Spychała & Partnerzy. Until 2022, it housed the headquarters of the insurance company Powszechny Zakład Ubezpieczeń (PZU).

== History ==
The skyscraper was designed by architects Tadeusz Spychała, Wojciech Popławski, and Willibald Furst, from the architecture firm Spychała & Partnerzy. It was originally envisioned as a hotel and referred to during the design process as the Les Tours Business Research Center. During its construction, it was bought by the insurance company Powszechny Zakład Ubezpieczeń (PZU), to become its office headquarters, under the name PZU Tower. The building was constructed in place of the Main Building of the Jewish Religious Community, originally opened around 1892, and demolished in the 1950s. It housed the headquarters of the Judaist community in the city.

The building was fitted with a glass elevation installed on top of its proper façade with windows, to aid in heat isolation. In 2006, some of the glass panels became loose, posing a risk of falling out. To protect the pedestrians, the building was surrounded with a temporary wooden protective structure. The glass elevation was ultimately removed in 2010. During its construction, it was also planned to install a large jumbotron screen on its side, however, it was cancel as its mounting gathered large quantities of snow during winter.

In 2022, Powszechny Zakład Ubezpieczeń moved its headquarters to the Y tower in the Generation Park office complex at 4 Daszyński Roundabout in Warsaw. In 2023, the company submitted an application to the municipal government, to determent the conditions for the reconstruction and extension of the skyscraper, consisting of the demolition of the existing building and replacing it with a new, higher building.

== Characteristics ==
PZU Tower has 28 storeys, with its height to the roof measuring 94 m, and its total height to its roof being 97 m. It has a total floor area of 55,600 m^{2}, and includes 4 underground storeys. The building has blue glass hues and a gently rounded shape. The skyscraper features an air conditioning system, which is turned off when a window in a room is opened, to preserve on energy and costs. The building features movable mirrors on the roof, directing reflected sunlight to the interior open-air patio, located on its final 8 floors, through the appropriate alignment of the mirror planes. A distinctive window-cleaning crane is placed on its roof.
