= Krupinski =

Krupinski or Krupiński (feminine: Krupińska) is a Polish surname. It may also be transliterated into other languages as Krupinsky.

People with the name include:

- Franciszek Krupiński (1836–1898), Polish philosopher
- Jerry W. Krupinski (contemporary), American politician from Ohio; state legislator
- Józef Krupiński (1930–1998), Polish poet
- Eileen Krupinski (contemporary), American politician from Ohio; state legislator
- Emil Krupa-Krupinsky (Krupinski) (1872- 1924), German painter
- Michał Krupiński (born 1981), Polish economist and government minister
- Paulina Krupińska (born 1987), Polish beauty pageant titleholder
- Walter Krupinski (1920–2000), German Luftwaffe fighter ace of World War II
- Waltrud Krupinski, a fictional character from the anime/manga Strike Witches
