= 1 Farna Street building =

Historic building in Szczecin, Poland

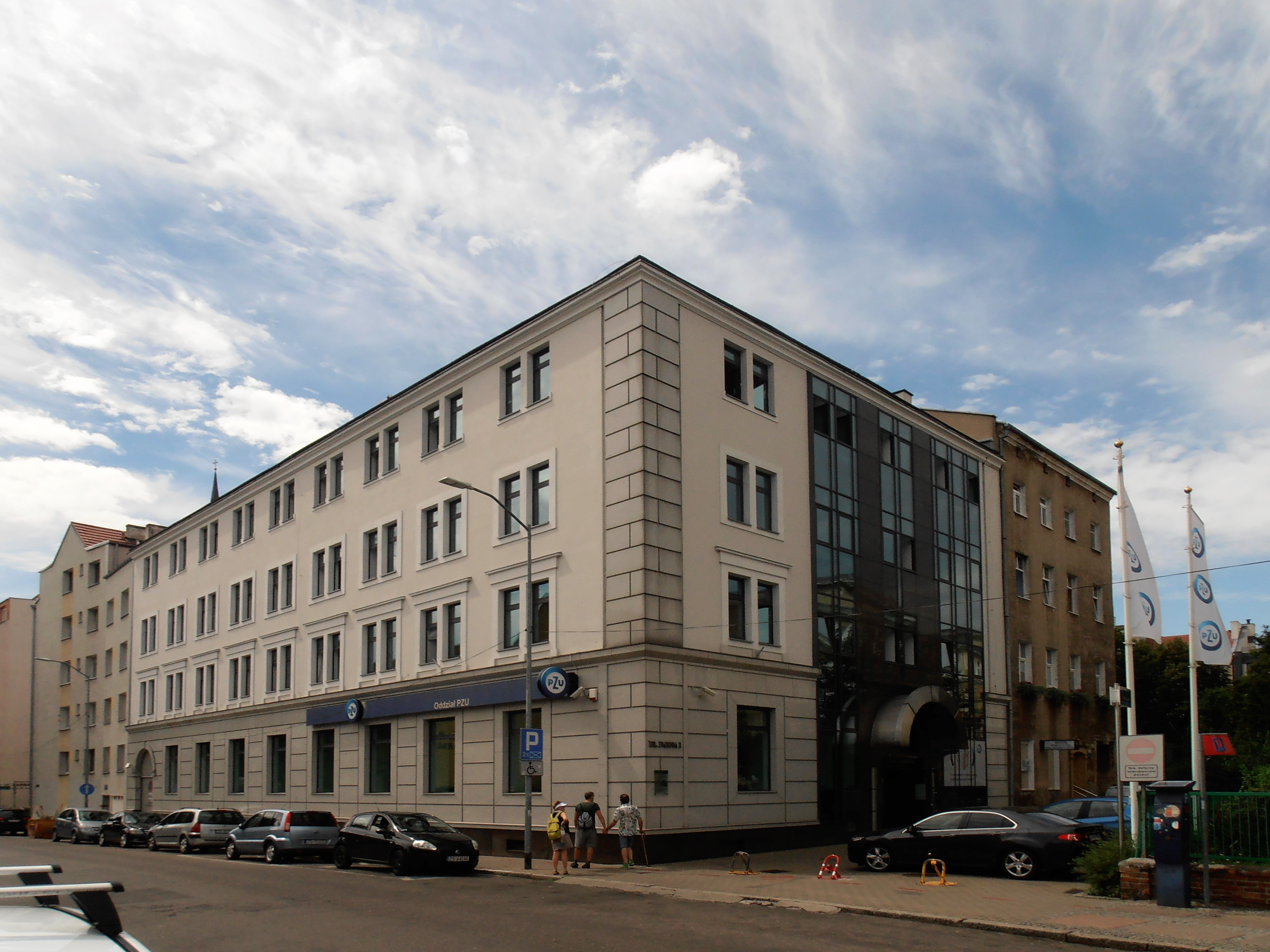
- The building in 2018.
- Interactive map of the 1 Farna Street building area

General information
- Type: Office building
- Architectural style: Postmodernist
- Location: 1 Farna Street, Old Town, Szczecin, Poland
- Coordinates: 53°25′35.4″N 14°33′27.1″E

Technical details
- Floor count: 5

1 Farna Street building (Polish: budynek przy ul. Farnej 1) is a historic five-storey building in Szczecin, Poland. It is located at 1 Farna Street in the Old Town neighbourhood, at the intersection with St. Mary Square. The oldest records of its existence date to the 18th century. Originally, the building had a neoclassical façade, which was replaced with a postmodernist design in 1995. It is best known as the birthplace and first childhood home of Catherine the Great, the Empress of Russia from 1762 to 1796. It is currently used as an office building of the insurance company Powszechny Zakład Ubezpieczeń.

== History ==
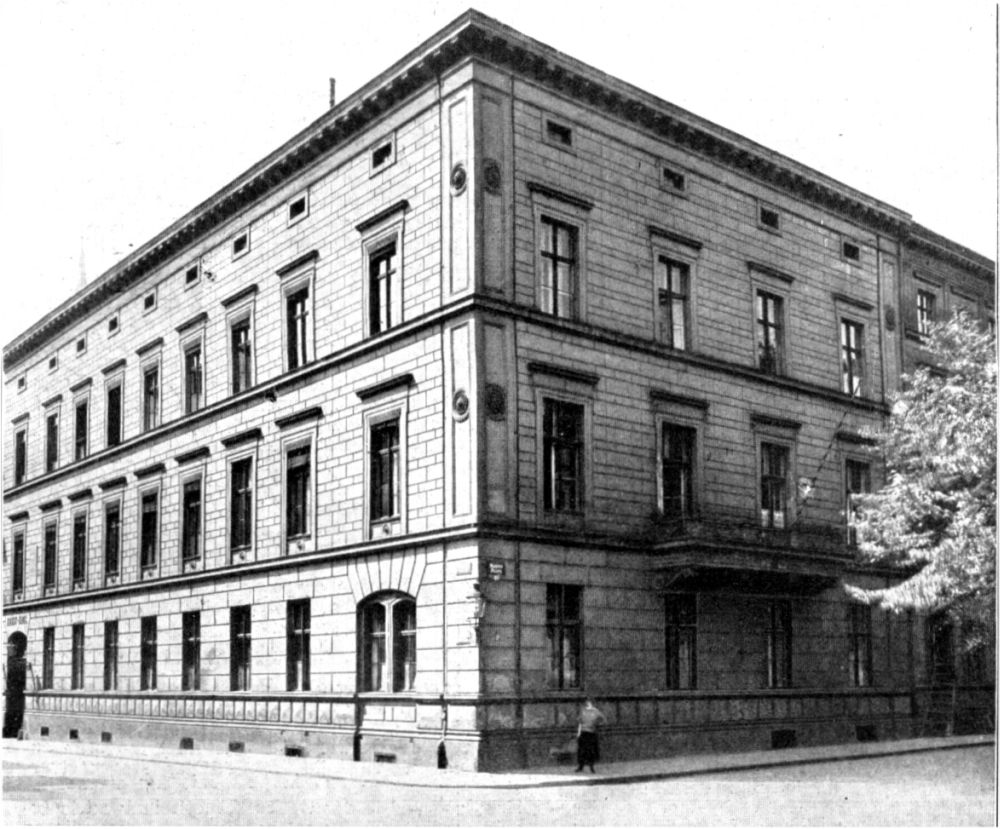
The building in 1925, featuring its original neoclassical façade.

The oldest known records of the building's existence date to the 18th century, when it belonged to the owner of the local chamber of commerce, and was leased to Christian August, the prince of Anhalt-Zerbst. On 2 May 1729, his daughter, Catherine the Great, the Empress of the Russian Empire from 1762 to 1796, was born in the building. She lived in the building for the first few years of her life, before moving with her family to the Szczecin Ducal Castle. In 1889, in commemoration of Catherine the Great's birthplace, a commemorative plaque was unveiled on the building's façade, featuring an inscription in German and Russian.

Originally, it was a five-story building with architectural detail in the neoclassical style. The elevation facing Farna Street was longer, with nine axes, and on the side of St. Mary Square, the façade had four axes. The individual floors were separated by cornices. The ground floor featured rustical ornamentation, and windows on the first and second floors were decorated with bands and pediments. In addition, the space between the cornice above the ground floor and the windows on the first floor was decorated with tondos. A balcony adjoined the second and third axes of the façade facing St. Mary Square. The corner of the building was characterised by ornamentation in the form of panels with tondos. The top floor of the building concealed an attic lit with small windows, and it was topped with a crowning cornice.

In the 1920s, the building was used as the headquarters of the council of the Randow District, a subdivision of the Region of Stettin in the Province of Pomerania.

The façade decorations were removed, after the end of the Second World War. The building underwent a general renovation and modernisation between 1994 and 1995. It gained a postmodernist façade with details referring to its original appearance. Currently, it is an office building used by the insurance company Powszechny Zakład Ubezpieczeń.
