= Tractable =

Tractable may refer to:

- Operation Tractable, a military operation in Normandy 1944
- Tractable problem, in computational complexity theory, a problem that can be solved in polynomial time
- Tractable, ease of obtaining a mathematical solution such as a closed-form expression
- Tractable (company), an artificial intelligence company from the United Kingdom
