= Julia Collins =

Julia Collins may refer to:

== People ==
- Julia C. Collins (c. 1842–1965), African-American writer
- Julia Collins (gameshow contestant) (born 1982), American gameshow contestant
- Julia Collins (entrepreneur)

== Characters ==
- Julia Collins, a fictional character from the 1947 U.S. western film Under Colorado Skies
- Julia Collins, a fictional character from the 1960s U.S. ABC TV show Dark Shadows
- Julia Collins, a fictional character from "Tangled Hearts" in 1970s UK BBC TV show Wodehouse Playhouse

== See also ==
- Collins (disambiguation)
- Julia (disambiguation)
