= Momentum Mississippi =

- Abbreviation: MoMS
- Formation: 2004
- Type: Public-private partnership
- Purpose: Long term economic and education development

Momentum Mississippi is a public–private partnership that aims to develop the economy and increase employment levels in the U.S. state of Mississippi. It was created in 2004 by Mississippi Governor Haley Barbour to implement recommendations of the "Blueprint Mississippi" study, which was initiated by the Mississippi Economic Council, and was adopted in 2005. Its major goals are to increase per capita income and employment, bring new investments and jobs, and improve education in Mississippi, through coordinated strategies and legislation.

In a 2005 interview, Governor Haley Barbour said that existing economic incentives had focused more on the manufacturing sector, and that the project aimed to bring technology, research and development, distribution and financial services into state business planning.

The project included support for legislation designed to increase existing tax credits administered by the Mississippi Development Authority. This included investment incentives for manufacturing sector jobs, technology industries and other existing Mississippi businesses through issuance of bonds.

In 2010, Soladigm, a technology company based in Milpitas, California which manufactures energy efficient windows, announced it would open a manufacturing plant in the Olive Branch Industrial Park in Olive Branch, Mississippi Barbour said the state provided a $40 million loan through the Mississippi Industry Incentive Financing Revolving Fund, in addition to $4 million in Momentum Mississippi incentives for project improvements at the company's new facility.
