= Zymergen =

American biotechnology company

Zymergen Inc.
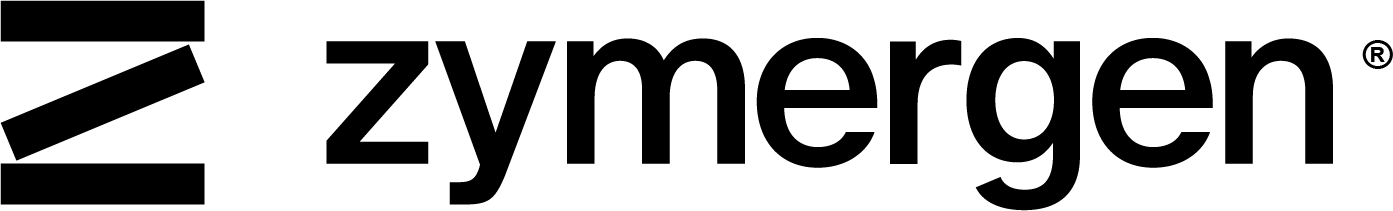
- Type: Subsidiary
- Traded as: Nasdaq: ZY
- Industry: Biotechnology
- Founded: 2013; 13 years ago
- Founders: Jed Dean; Josh Hoffman; Zach Serber
- Defunct: February 5, 2024; 2 years ago
- Headquarters: Emeryville, California, U.S.
- Key people: Jay Flatley (Chairman & acting CEO); Steven Chu (Board member)
- Parent: Ginkgo Bioworks

Zymergen was an American biotechnology company based in Emeryville, California. The company applies genomics and machine learning to research and design chemical producing genetically modified organisms. It claimed that its manufacturing process was safer and cheaper than traditional manufacturing, but was unable to demonstrate this. Shortly after going public in 2021, it was reported that the company was facing difficulties in manufacturing and struggling to make revenue. In July 2022, Ginkgo Bioworks agreed to acquire Zymergen for $300 million.

== History ==
Zymergen was founded in 2013. by investment banker Joshua Hoffman, biophysicist Zach Serber, and biochemist Jed Dean. All three met while working at Amyris, Inc. The company uses machine learning and artificial intelligence to study and modify microbes which ferment carbon to produce chemicals used in manufacturing consumer goods and pharmaceuticals. Part of its research was into the production of alternatives to petroleum products. The company claimed that it would be able to biologically produce materials more safely and at a lower cost than traditionally manufactured petroleum products, but was unable to demonstrate the performance of its materials.

The company raised $2 million in 2013, $44 million in 2015, $130 million from SoftBank's Vision Fund in 2016, $400 million in 2018, and $300 million in 2020. The company reportedly included DARPA and Fortune 500 companies among its customers by 2016. In 2018, Zymergen acquired fellow biotechnology firm Radiant Genomics. According to an insider source reported by Forbes, the company was failing to generate revenue by this point but continued to attract investment. By April 2020, the company had begun to lay off between 10% and 15% of its employees.

The company released its first product, Hyaline, in December 2020. Hyaline is a bio-manufactured polyimide film made from diamine monomers. The material was transparent and flexible, and was marketed for use with consumer electronics such as flexible smartphones and tablets. In April 2021, the company went public with a $500 million IPO. The IPO was led by JPMorgan Chase and Goldman Sachs.

Regulatory filings with the U.S. Securities and Exchange Commission in July revealed that the company had made only $13 million in revenue during 2020, and had lost over $262 million. The filings also revealed that the company was struggling to produce Hyaline, and that two of its companies had complained that it did not work with their manufacturing process. When these operational problems became public it resulted in a sharp reduction in market capitalization and shareholder lawsuits were filed shortly after.

In August 2021, the company revealed that Hyaline was not successful with customers, its foldable screen did not have as large of a market as anticipated, and it did not have any sources of revenue that year. This disclosure and Hoffman's resignation as CEO that month caused Zymergen's stock to plunge. He was replaced by acting CEO Jay Flatley, who is also currently Zymergen's chairman and Illumina, Inc.'s former CEO. After Zymergen's stock prices crashed, investor Cathie Wood began buying up its shares, which raised prices again.

In the wake of these financial issues, the company began restructuring to cut costs, including renegotiating loans, laying off hundreds of employees, and restructuring lease expenses for office space. The company's founder Jed Dean also left the company. In November 2021, Zymergen announced that it had abandoned the production of Hyaline, and would be focusing on drug and vaccine development. The company's highly publicized difficulties in bringing its projected products to market and financial issues drew comparisons to other biotechnology companies such as Theranos.

In July 2022, Ginkgo Bioworks agreed to acquire Zymergen for $300 million in an all-stock deal.

On October 3, 2023, Zymergen filed for Chapter 11 bankruptcy. On February 5, 2024, Zymergen announced that it would liquidate after selling all of its remaining assets and employee layoffs.
