= Desktop Metal =

American manufacturer of 3D printers

Desktop Metal, Inc.
- Type: Public
- Traded as: NYSE: DM
- Industry: Manufacturing
- Genre: Metal 3D printing
- Founded: October 2015; 11 years ago in Cambridge, Massachusetts
- Founders: Ric Fulop, Jonah Myerberg, Ely Sachs, Rick Chin, Christopher Schuh, A. John Hart, Yet-Ming Chiang
- Headquarters: Burlington, Massachusetts, United States
- Key people: Ric Fulop (CEO); Jonah Myerberg (CTO)
- Products: 3D printing systems
- Revenue: ▼US$190 million (2023)
- Number of employees: 950 (2023)
- Website: desktopmetal.com

Desktop Metal, Inc. is a public American technology company that designs and markets 3D printing systems. Headquartered in Burlington, Massachusetts, the company has raised $438 million in venture funding since its founding from investors such as Google Ventures, BMW, and Ford Motor Company. Desktop Metal launched its first two products in April 2017: the Studio System, a metal 3D printing system catered to engineers and small production runs, and the Production System, intended for manufacturers and large-scale printing. In November 2019, the company launched two new printer systems: the Shop System for machine shops, and the Fiber industrial-grade composites printer for automated fiber placement. The World Economic Forum named Desktop Metal a Technology Pioneer in 2017.

== History ==
=== 2015–2016 ===
Desktop Metal was founded in October 2015 in Cambridge, Massachusetts, as a startup company focused on 3D metal printing. Among the seven founders were Ric Fulop and Jonah Myerberg of A123 Systems, Rick Chin of SolidWorks, and Yet-Ming Chiang, Ely Sachs, Christopher Schuh, and A. John Hart of the Massachusetts Institute of Technology (MIT). Sachs was known for coining the term 3D printing years earlier. At the time of its founding, the company was developing a process for metal 3D printing that would be fast and small enough for office settings. Xconomy wrote that the company's intent was to create a metal 3D printer that would "churn out parts more quickly" and be "much cheaper, smaller, safer and easier to operate" than alternatives on the market. To eliminate the need for trained personnel to operate the equipment, dangerous features such as lasers were not made a part of the design process. By October 2015 the company had 11 employees, with Ric Fulop as CEO.

Initially the company raised around $14 million in startup funding, with leading Series A funders including New Enterprise Associates, Kleiner Perkins, and Lux Capital. By the spring of 2016, the company was headquartered in Lexington, Massachusetts, and had developed functioning prototypes. After former investors injected an additional $34 million into Desktop Metal in April 2016, that summer the company raised funding from investors including GE Ventures and Saudi Aramco Energy Ventures. By February 2017, the company had moved its headquarters to Burlington, Massachusetts. That month the company raised $45 million in a Series C round of venture funding led by GV and including participation from BMW iVentures and Lowe's Ventures. With total raised brought to $97 million, the capital was used for research and development, with plans to begin selling the first product later that year in a variety of industries.

=== 2017 ===
Desktop Metal was collaborating with Ford Motor Company's research and advanced engineering and manufacturing teams by 2017, refining its system to meet manufacturing requirements. Desktop Metals was also working with BMW in Munich to explore eliminating the need to warehouse parts, and companies such as Milwaukee Tools and Jabil Circuit Inc. A U.S. were evaluating the printers for production use. The company revealed two distinct metal 3D printing systems in late April 2017: a studio model and a production model. The Studio System, safe for office settings is designed for rapid printing and the production of small volumes, while the latter is intended for high-speed production of parts. Both systems include a printer, furnace, and cloud-based software to operate the machines, with the ability to print several hundred alloy types. Forbes described the pricing scheme of the products as "competitive," noting the systems cost "10 times less than what's on the market."

Stratasys, an investor in Desktop Metal, announced in May 2017 that its resellers would stock Desktop Metal's products. The World Economic Forum named Desktop Metal to its 2017 Technology Pioneers list of 30 companies in June, and also that month, MIT Technology Review named Desktop Metal among its 50 Smartest Companies in the World for the year. Desktop Metal raised a total of $115 million in a Series D round of funding in July 2017, its largest round to that point. Funds went to R&D, its sales program, and international growth and brought the total raised since founding to $212 million. The company began shipping the Studio System in December 2017 as part of its "Pioneer" program. The first printer went to Google's Advanced Technology and Products Group and among other early customers were the United States Navy, Built-Rite Tool & Die, and Lumenium.

=== 2018 ===
By early 2018 the company had been granted two patents for separable support and an interface layer, with around 100 patents pending for around 200 inventions. In February 2018 the company previewed Live Parts, a software program for automatically generating printable designs.

At CES 2018 Desktop Metal won an emerging tech award from Digital Trends. In 2018 it also won a Gold Edison Award. In March 2018, Ford Motor Company led a $65 million investment round in Desktop Metal, with Ford's CTO joining Desktop Metal's board of directors. With a $1.2 billion valuation, by May 2018 Desktop Metal had been named the fast growing "unicorn" in United States history, surpassing $1 billion after 21 months in operation. Desktop Metal introduced an upgrade to its industrial scale systems at Formnext 2018, claiming the 50% printing speed increase made the model "the fastest metal printer in the world." Cofounder Ric Fulop asserted that the system dropped the price per part significantly compared to other systems, in one case from $700 per kilo of parts to $50 a kilo.

=== 2019–present ===
In January 2019, Desktop Metal raised an additional $160 million in funding, resulting in a valuation at $1.5 billion. By May 2019, the company employed around 300 people, mostly engineers, with the machines made through contract manufacturing. It also had a sales channel distributing in 48 countries. In June 2019, the company began shipping to Europe. By 2019, the company had raised $437 million from investors, and was one of only three 3D printing unicorns. In November it introduced a system for metal job shops and a system using fiber placement.

In December 2020, the company started trading on the New York Stock Exchange (NYSE) under the ticker DM. They did this via a reverse IPO merger with Trine Acquisition Corp. (NYSE:TRNE), a special-purpose acquisition company.

In January 2021, Desktop Metal purchased EnvisionTEC, a German company that specializes in photopolymer printing. On March 15, Desktop Metal announced its new line Desktop Health, specifically focused on healthcare products in the fields of dentistry, orthodontics, dermatology, orthopedics, cardiology, plastic surgery, and printed regenerative. Also in March, Michael Mazen Jafar came on board as CEO of the new line.

In May 2023, industrial 3D printer company Stratasys agreed to acquire Desktop Metal in an all-stock transaction valuing the combined company at $1.8 billion, in which existing Desktop Metal shareholders will own around 41 percent of the combined company. Stratasys terminated the acquisition in September after its shareholders voted against the acquisition after two companies made unsolicited bids for Stratasys.

In July 2024, Nano Dimension announced an agreement to acquire Desktop Metal for $135–183 million in an all-cash transaction.

In July 2025, Desktop Metal filed for Chapter 11 bankruptcy protection as part of a plan to sell its European assets.

== Products ==
=== Printer systems ===
Desktop Metal launched its first two products in April 2017: the Studio System, a metal 3D printing system designed for engineers and small production runs, and the Production System, intended for manufacturers and large-scale printing. In 2019 the company introduced the Shop System, a metal binder jetting printing system designed for machine and metal job shops, as well as Fiber, a continuous carbon fiber printer using automated fiber placement technology (AFP) to make parts.

==== Studio System ====
Both the Studio System and Production System include two key components: a printer that produces small objects out of metal powders, and a sintering furnace to densify the objects using thermal processes. The systems can print a variety of materials, including steels, copper, aluminum, and alloys such as Inconel. Powders also used in the metal injection molding market are housed in replaceable cartridges made by various metallurgy companies and Desktop Metal. As the process doesn't utilize high power lasers, or hazardous materials, the Studio System can be housed inside office spaces with standard wall outlets.

The Studio System uses a proprietary technology called Bound Metal Deposition, similar to fused deposition modeling (FDM) where the printer "extrudes a mixture of metal powder and polymers to build up a shape, much as some plastic printers do." When the shape is complete, it is placed in a furnace which burns away the polymers and "compacts the metal particles by sintering them together at just below their melting point." At that temperature the metal is fused without melting and losing its shape. The sintering causes predictable shrinking, which the system's software compensates for by making items slightly larger during the printing step. Beyond the printer and furnace, the Studio System also includes a debinder to remove part of the polymer binder before sintering.

==== Production System ====
The Production System uses a printing method where droplets of a binding agent are "jetted" onto a metal powder in heated layers. The method is called Single Pass Jetting, used for quickly producing metal parts. According to the company, the system can process 8,200 cubic centimeters per hour, which is nearly 100 times faster than laser-based systems using powder bed fusion (PBF). It can produce dozens of parts simultaneously. The Production System was named by Popular Science as one of the top engineering innovations of 2017, in the magazine's annual Best of What's New issue.

=== Live Parts software ===
Desktop Metal developed Live Parts, claimed to be an AI software for users to automatically generate printable object designs. The program allows users to input specifications for an object, then creates a computer model which can be printed using any 3-D printing system.

== See also ==
- List of 3D printer manufacturers
