= Ginkgo Bioworks =

American biotechnology company

Ginkgo Bioworks Holdings, Inc.
- Type: Public
- Traded as: NYSE: DNA (Class A)
- Industry: Biotechnology
- Founded: 2008; 18 years ago in Boston, Massachusetts, U.S.
- Founders: Tom Knight, Jason Kelly, Reshma Shetty, Barry Canton, Austin Che
- Headquarters: Boston, Massachusetts, U.S.
- Key people: Shyam Sankar (chairman); Jason Kelly (CEO)
- Revenue: ▼US$227 million (2024)
- Operating income: ▲US$−560 million (2024)
- Net income: ▲US$−547 million (2024)
- Total assets: ▼US$1.38 billion (2024)
- Total equity: ▼US$716 million (2024)
- Number of employees: 834 (2024)
- Website: ginkgobioworks.com

Ginkgo Bioworks Holdings, Inc. is an American biotechnology company founded in 2008 by five scientists from MIT. The company uses genetic engineering to produce bacteria with industrial applications for other biotech companies, reducing the need for other companies to repeat the initial stages of synthetic biology design. The self-proclaimed "Organism Company" was one of the world's largest privately held biotech companies, valued at $4.2 billion in 2019. It raised $290 million in September and $350 million in October of that year. Ginkgo Bioworks went public on the New York Stock Exchange through a SPAC merger on September 17, 2021.

== History ==
In 2014, Ginkgo was the first biotechnology company to join the Y Combinator start-up accelerator program.

On 16 December 2020, it was reported that Ginkgo Bioworks would acquire the primary assets of Novogy's Microbial Engineering Platform. 2020 also saw the company acquire property worth $25 million from Marcus Partners for the construction of a new 219,000 square foot laboratory building, after razing existing structures, located in the Raymond L Flynn Marine Park. As of 2021, the company also occupied 200,000 square feet of the Innovation and Design Building (aka IDB) in the Park. Ginkgo also occupied facilities in Cambridge, where most MIT-spin outs resided at the time.

Growth of Ginkgo up to 2021 had been driven by "robust venture capital funding" and entry into the COVID-19 testing market. This included $45 million from Viking Global in 2015.

On 11 May 2021, Ginkgo Bioworks announced plans of going public through a merger with SPAC Soaring Eagle at a $17.5 billion valuation.

On 14 May 2021, Ginkgo announced its new ticker for the NYSE will be "DNA". The ticker was previously used by Genentech, who stopped using the ticker after they were acquired by Roche. Trading began on September 17, 2021. The investment management firm Baillie Gifford became the largest shareholder (15%) with the purchase of 167.75 million shares on 31 March 2022.

On 14 March 2022, it was reported that Ginkgo Bioworks signed a Definitive Agreement to Acquire FGen AG, a leading bioengineering company and its proprietary ultra-high-throughput screening platform.

On 6 June 2022, it was reported that Ginkgo Bioworks has acquired assets from real-time metabolite monitoring company, Bitome.

On 25 July 2022, Ginkgo Bioworks agreed to acquire Zymergen for $300 million in an all-stock deal.

On 27 July 2022, it was reported that Ginkgo Bioworks would acquire Bayer's Biologics Research & Development site, located in West Sacramento. Ginkgo will enter into a new multi-year platform collaboration with Bayer. The deal includes the integration of the R&D platform assets from Joyn Bio, a joint-venture between Leaps by Bayer investments and Ginkgo Bioworks.

On 4 October 2022, it was reported that Ginkgo Bioworks would acquire France-based adaptive laboratory evolution instruments developer Altar and California-based Circularis to strengthen capabilities in cell and gene therapy.

In October 2022, Bloomberg News reported that Ginkgo Bioworks partnered with Intelligence Advanced Research Projects Activity to create a software tool to help detect when biological organisms have been genetically engineered. The tool known as ENDAR (short for Engineered Nucleotide Detection and Ranking) could be used to provide an early warning of bioweapons and other man-made biological threats.

== Fraud allegations ==
On 6 October 2021, a market research firm published a report accusing Ginkgo of embellishing its revenue in a complex scheme highly dependent on related-party transactions. The report prompted an inquiry into Ginkgo by the United States Department of Justice. In November 2021, Ginkgo was sued in a shareholder lawsuit alleging it misrepresented its revenue sources in statements regarding its merger with a special-purpose acquisition company. As of 2021, the company could not name a single significant product that is manufactured and sold using its organisms.

In March 2023, the former Attorney General of Louisiana launched an investigation into the officers and directors of Ginkgo.

== See also ==
- Precigen, Inc.
