= Rajeev Misra =

Banker and executive based in London

- Born: 1962 (age 63–64); Balasore, Odisha, India
- Education: Delhi Public School, Mathura Road; IIT Delhi; University of Pennsylvania; MIT Sloan School of Management
- Occupation: Investor
- Title: Former CEO of SoftBank Investment Advisers

Rajeev Misra is an Indian British banker and executive. He was the CEO of SoftBank Investment Advisers.

== Early life and education ==
Misra was born on 18 January 1962 in Balasore, Odisha, India. He attended Delhi Public School at Mathura Road, Delhi, India; studied chemical engineering at IIT Delhi; and the University of Pennsylvania (gaining a Bachelor's in Mechanical Engineering and then a Master of Computer Applications [MCA]). This was followed by a Master of Business Administration (MBA) at the Sloan School of Management at the Massachusetts Institute of Technology (MIT). Misra is a board member of both the University of Pennsylvania and MIT Sloan, and is on the board of trustees of Kaust.

== Career ==
Misra was Board Director of Softbank Group and CEO of Softbank Investment Advisers. Misra, who leads the team running the company's Vision Fund, joined SoftBank in 2014.

Misra spent about 25 years in finance, moving from Merrill Lynch to Deutsche Bank to UBS. At Deutsche Bank, he oversaw a team of credit traders whose bet against the U.S. subprime mortgage market was chronicled in The Big Short. He left Deutsche Bank in June 2008, when he was the global head for credit and commodities and was reportedly earning between 10 and 15 million euros a year. He then worked at the London-based TCI Fund for several months. He joined UBS in 2009, and in May 2014 he was a senior managing partner of Fortress Investment Group, until he joined Softbank in November 2014.

The Wall Street Journal detailed Misra's alleged attempts to undermine his internal rivals at Softbank, including planting stories, filing shareholder complaints, and using a "honey trap".

In July 2022, he stepped back from his executive roles at SoftBank Group to start his own venture fund, as reported by various news agencies. He has secured over $6 billion, including from Middle East investors.

In November 2024, Rajeev Misra announced that he was formally stepping down as co-chief executive officer of SoftBank Group Corp.’s Vision Fund.

== Sources ==
- David Enrich, Dark Towers: Deutsche Bank, Donald Trump, and an Epic Trail of Destruction, Custom House (2020) ISBN 978-0062878816 - The story of Deutsche Bank and Rajeev's role in it.
