= Beata Kozłowska-Chyła =

Polish banker

- Education: Doctorate at University of Warsaw
- Occupation: Banker
- Known for: President of Management Board at PZU

Beata Kozłowska-Chyła is a Polish banker and the former President of the Management Board of PZU, the largest insurance provider in Poland as well as Eastern and Central Europe. She works as a lecturer within the University of Warsaw.

== Early life and education ==
Born in 1970, Beata Kozłowska-Chyła is an alumna of the University of Warsaw, having graduated with a doctoral degree from the Faculty of Law and Administration. She also earned a post-doctorate degree in legal sciences and currently serves as a lecturer at the Faculty of Law and Administration at the university. During the years 1994–1997, she received legal training, attaining official credentials as a legal counsel and securing a spot in the roster of legal counsels overseen by the District Chamber of Legal Counsels in Warsaw.

== Career ==
Beginning in 2010, Beata Kozłowska-Chyła has been serving as a recommended arbitrator at the Court of Arbitration within the National Chamber of Commerce in Warsaw. Previously she acted as an advisor to the minister of finance and held the role of deputy director within the Legal and Licensing Department at the Pension Funds Supervision Authority. She also was the president of the Polish Economic Publishing House. She has been chairman of the supervisory board of Grupa LOTOS S.A. from June 2016 until their merger with the ORLEN group in late 2022. Furthermore, she was a member of the supervisory board of TEI PZU SA and PIE PZU SA. Beata Kozłowska-Chyła currently holds positions on the council of the Polish Olympic Committee and the Social Council for Sports under the Ministry of Sports and Tourism. In October 2020, Beata Kozłowska-Chyła was elected as the president of PZU, the largest insurance provider in Eastern and Central Europe, after already being a board member in 2007. In February 2024, she was dismissed by the board and replaced by Anita Elżanowska.
