= Julia Collins (entrepreneur) =

Food tech entrepreneur

- Born: San Francisco, California
- Education: Harvard University, Stanford University
- Occupation: Food tech entrepreneur
- Notable work: Co-Founder of Zume, Planet FWD

Julia Collins is a food tech entrepreneur who has spent her career building food companies, including Zume Pizza where she became the first Black woman to co-found a unicorn company.

== Early life and education ==
Collins was born in San Francisco, California. She earned her Bachelor’s from Harvard University in 2001 and her Master of Business Administration from Stanford University in 2009.

== Career ==
Collins first started in the New York restaurant industry, co-creating a restaurant chain, Mexicue in 2010 and serving as director of Murray's Cheese in 2012. In 2015, Collins helped develop Zume Pizza as a co-founder with Alex Garden. Zume Pizza is a robot-powered pizza-making business that uses robotics and automation to create pizza. As of 2018, the Zume Pizza is worth 2.25 billion. Through Zume, Collins became the first Black woman to co-found a unicorn company.

In 2019, Collins also founded Planet FWD, a carbon management platform for consumer brands to help understand their carbon footprint. Some of the major brands Planet FWD has worked with are: Clif Bar, Blue Apron, Kashi, Numi Organic Tea. They also sell their own brand of carbon neutral snacks called Moonshot Snacks, with a focus on regenerative agricultural practices, local suppliers and recycled packaging.

== Recognitions and Awards ==
Julia Collins was recognized for three consecutive years by major magazines. Her first recognition was in 2020 by Newsweek, they named her one of the "13 Tech Innovators Helping to Save the Planet" and praised her for her commitment and effort to fight against climate change. The very next year, in 2021, ABC7 Chicago featured her as an entrepreneur born and raised in San Francisco, using food technology to raise awareness about climate issues, while also acknowledging her past restaurant experience, explaining that this helped influence her mission. She was then recognized by Forbes in 2022 for her leadership at Planet FDW and commended her for continuing to make the business grow, especially during a time of investing challenges. Collins most recent award was in 2025 from the Global Food Change Maker prize from KM ZERO Food Innovation Hub. They recognized her for her effort in reducing pollution caused by food industries.

== Boards and Advisories ==
Collins currently serves on the board of directors for Climate Collaborative and Food for Climate League. Climate Collaborative is a nonprofit organization that focuses on promoting eco-friendly practices in food and retail. Some of these practices include reducing food waste, adopting renewable energy and improving sustainable packaging. This project became independent in 2021 and is focusing on building regenerative food systems by making it easier for businesses to adopt eco-friendly practices. Food for Climate League is a nonprofit organization that is led by women that works to normalize climate-smart eating. The organization uses behavioral science, communications and campaigns to help change the way we think about food and the environment.

== Planet FWD ==
Planet FWD uses the Greenhouse Gas Protocol that was developed in 1998 by the World Resources Institute (WRI) and the World Business Council for Sustainable Development (WBCSD). This platform was made to help food and beverage brands measure their carbon footprint. The platform measures the use of company's carbon footprint across 3 scopes. The first scope focuses on the company's own emissions, scope 2 focuses on the electricity and energy they buy and scope 3 focuses on farming, ingredients, packaging and transportation. This tool uses a broad range of data collected on farming and food production to see how food is grown, processed and shipped. This process helps the companies track how much greenhouse gases each step creates and what changes they can make to cut the most pollution.

This tool also helps companies follow international rules and goals for climate change. The tool Planet FWD uses is a climate calculator for food brands. It shows where the pollution is coming from in their products and what choices they can make to become more eco-friendly. The Greenhouse Gas Protocol provides the worlds most used greenhouse gas accounting standards for companies and organizations.
