= View, Inc. =

Glass manufacturing company

- Type: Private (2007-21; since 2024); Public (2021-24)
- Traded as: Nasdaq: VIEW (2021-24)
- Industry: Smart glass, Smart Building Solutions
- Founded: 2007
- Founder: Paul Nguyen & Mike Scobey
- Headquarters: Milpitas, California, United States
- Key people: Rao Mulpuri (CEO)
- Website: www.view.com

View, Inc. is an American glass-manufacturing company specializing in the production of smart glass.

Founded in 2007, the company was headquartered in Milpitas, California and had a manufacturing facility in Olive Branch, Mississippi.

== History ==
The company was co-founded in April 2007 by Paul Nguyen and Mike Scobey as eChromics. Based in Santa Rosa, California . The company was renamed Soladigm in October 2007 and appointed Rao Mulpuri as CEO in December 2008. The firm moved its headquarters to Milpitas, California in a reconditioned Seagate Technology factory.

In July 2010, the company announced its intent to start production from a new facility in Olive Branch, Mississippi. The same year, it was one of 12 winners of General Electric's $200 million "Ecomagination Challenge". It received a $3.5 million grant from the U.S. Department of Energy from the American Recovery and Reinvestment Act.

The company name was changed to View, Inc. in November 2012 and began shipping from its new factory near the end of the third quarter of 2012. In 2015, the company's glass was installed at the new Overstock headquarters in Salt Lake City.

In 2019, the OAA installed View Dynamic Glass at its headquarters.

In 2024, View filed for Chapter 11 bankruptcy. The company will go private and be taken over by its lenders, which will help reduce a large portion of its $350 million debt load.

In October 2024, View laid off 147 workers in its Olive Branch, Mississippi factory after announcing plans to go private.

== Funding ==
In 2007, the company raised a Series A round of funding from Sigma Partners and Khosla Ventures, which later took over control of the company and received preferred shares.

In 2013, Corning led an investment round of $60 million for View. Madrone Capital Partners invested $100 million in the company in January 2014. The company received $150 million in late-stage funding in 2015. Funding was led by the New Zealand Super Fund.

In June 2017, BlackRock led a $200 million investment in View, bringing total funding for the company to $700 million.

In 2018, View, Inc. announced a $1.1 billion investment from the SoftBank Vision Fund.

In May 2022, View, Inc. announced that they may not have sufficient financial resources to meet its financial obligations for at least twelve months from the expected issuance date of its 2021 financial statements.

== Products and technology ==
The company's product, View Dynamic Glass, features an electrochromic (EC) coating composed of multiple layers of ceramic metal oxide with a thickness of 1 micron. Low voltage wiring is added so the tint of the glass can be controlled through an app or centralized software system in response to weather or interior temperature. Upon activation of the low-voltage direct current electrical signal, the materials in the insulating glass changes from transparent to up to 99% tinted for visible wavelengths.

The technology is designed to facilitate the entry of natural light into buildings and, when tinted, reduces glare and deflects infrared radiation. Each window pane can adjust its tint variably throughout the day. Additionally, every pane possesses a unique IP address, enabling its control via an app. The intensity of the tint can be adjusted to control glare, direct sunlight coming in, and to modify privacy.

By 2016, the company made panels that could be retrofitted as well as panels based on builders' specifications.

In 2018, the firm partnered with Microsoft Azure IoT to develop a physical security system that notifies building managers when glass breaks.

== Litigation ==
In January 2009, Nguyen was relieved of his role as CTO and was dismissed the following month. In January 2010, Nguyen filed a lawsuit against the company, questioning the validity of the company's financing rounds and alleging his dismissal breached the company's certificate of incorporation voting agreement. The parties agreed to arbitration, and in December 2015, the arbitrator ruled in Nguyen's favor. This decision, as noted by a judge in subsequent proceedings, had a significant impact on View's capital structure".

In Feb 2018, following challenges from investors, the litigation reached a settlement, which temporarily solidified the company's capital structure. This case subsequently influenced a proposal to revise Delaware's corporate law.

In December 2012, SAGE Electrochromics filed a patent infringement suit against View; View counter-sued a few months later.
