= Michał Krupiński =

Polish economist (born 1981)

Michal Krupinski
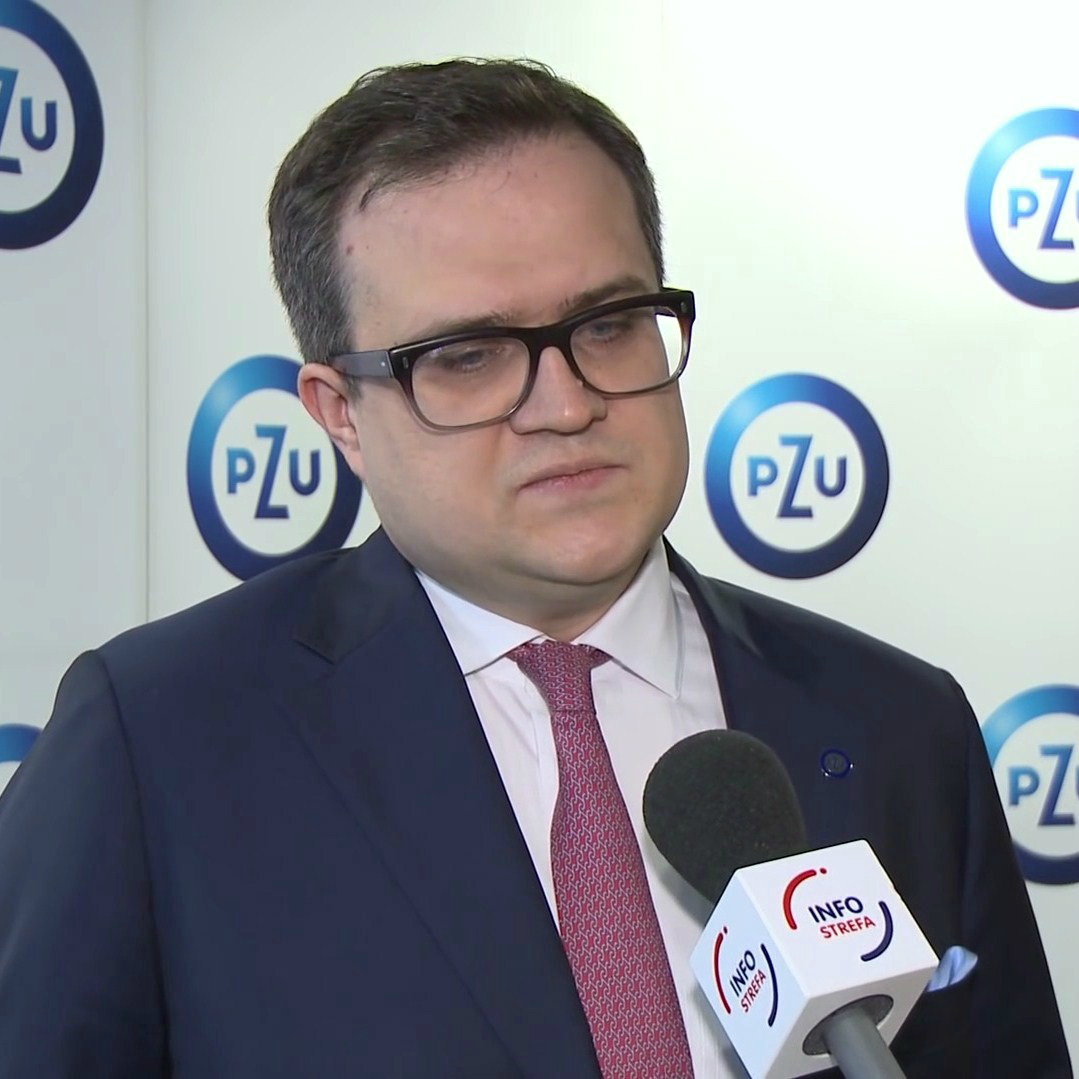
- Born: February 12, 1981; Kraków, Poland
- Education: SGH Warsaw School of Economics; Columbia Business School
- Occupations: Economist, banker and finance executive

Michał Tomasz Krupiński (born 12 February 1981) is a Polish economist, banker and finance executive.

== Life and education ==
From 2006 to 2008, he served as Undersecretary of State Treasury for the Polish government and the age of 25, he was the youngest person ever nominated to ministerial position in Poland.

In October 2008, he was designated to the position of Alternate Executive Director at the World Bank Group in Washington, D.C. where he represented several countries from Central and Eastern Europe and Central Asia at the Boards of IBRD, IFC and MIGA during the financial and economic crisis.

Since 2011, at Bank of America Merrill Lynch, Michal was Head of Global Banking and Markets for Central and Eastern Europe, leading with mergers & acquisitions and capital advisory.

In January 2016, Krupiński took over as President of the Management Board of PZU Group, the largest insurance and asset management company in Central and Eastern Europe.

From June 2017 till December 2019, he was appointed President of the Management Board of Bank Polska Kasa Opieki Spółka Akcyjna (Bank Pekao SA).

The Davos World Economic Forum awarded Michal Krupinski the title of Young Global Leader in 2012.

He graduated with an MSc in International Economics from SGH Warsaw School of Economics and achieved his Master of Advanced Studies in European Economy at Université Catholique de Louvain with Distinction. He also holds an MBA from Columbia Business School and attended Harvard University for Executive Studies.

Apart from Polish, he is fluent in English, French, German and Spanish.
