= Ping An Good Doctor =

Chinese healthcare platform

- Native name: 平安健康保险股份有限公司
- Type: Public company
- Traded as: SEHK: 1833
- Founded: June 2014; 12 years ago
- Headquarters: Shanghai, China
- Parent: Ping An Insurance
- Website: www.pagd.net

Ping An Good Doctor, formerly known as Ping An Healthcare and Technology (Chinese: 平安健康保险股份有限公司), is a health care software company. The company offers a mobile platform for online consultations, hospital referrals and appointments, health management, and wellness interaction services. Founded on November 12, 2014, Ping An Healthcare and Technology is headquartered in Shanghai, China.

== History ==
Ping An Good Doctor was founded on November 12, 2014.

Prior to its 2018 Initial Public Offering in Hong Kong, Ping An Healthcare and Technology was among the largest unicorn startup companies in China, with a valuation of approximately US 7.5 $billion. By 2019, the company was making US$ 716.4 million in revenue with a net loss of US$ 103.2 million. The COVID-19 pandemic instantly accelerated the development of the company.

In April 2020, Ping An Healthcare and Technology launched the Good Doctor Global Medical Consultation Platform. This platform enables people across the world to use either a browser interface or mobile phone app in order to both schedule and receive medical consultation services.

== Description ==
Ping An Healthcare offers online medical services and has 192.8 million registered users, with network coverage including 3,100 hospitals and 7,500 pharmacy outlets. It was China’s largest internet health care platform in terms of average monthly active users and daily average online consultations in 2016. Ping An Healthcare and Technology is one of several healthtech companies spun off from Ping An Insurance. It trades under the symbol 1833:HK, with a market capitalization of more than US $15 billion.
