= Powszechny Zakład Ubezpieczeń =

Polish insurance company

Powszechny Zakład Ubezpieczeń Spółka Akcyjna

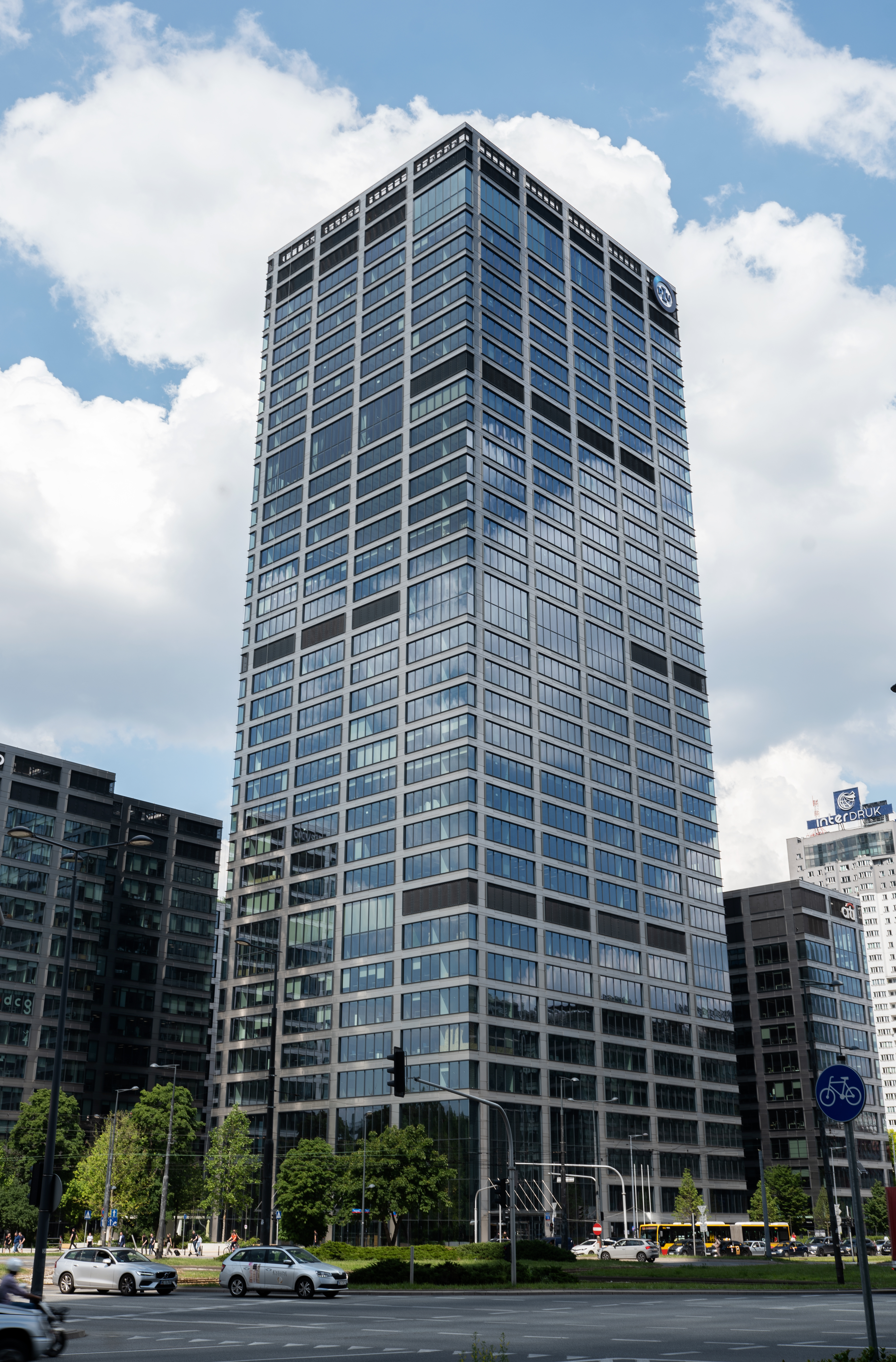
- Generation Park in Warsaw, PZU's headquarters
- Company type: Spółka Akcyjna
- Traded as: WSE: PZU; WIG30 component
- ISIN: PLPZU0000011
- Industry: Insurance, Financial services
- Founded: 1803; 223 years ago
- Headquarters: Generation Park, Warsaw, Poland
- Area served: Europe
- Key people: Bogdan Benczak (President of the Management Board); Robert Jastrzębski (Chairman)
- Products: Insurance and Banking
- Revenue: ▲US$19.89 billion (2025)
- Operating income: ▲US$ 4.75 billion (2025)
- Net income: ▲US$3.72 billion (2025)
- AUM: ▼€6.98 billion (2022)
- Total assets: ▲US$142.75 billion (2025)
- Owners: State assets (34.2%); BlackRock (5.0%); Others (60.80%)
- Number of employees: 38,655 (2025)
- Subsidiaries: AAS Balta; Alior Bank; Bank Pekao; PZU Asset Management Sp. z o.o. PZU Centrum Operacji SA; PZU Finance AB; PZU Lietuva; PZU Pomoc SA; PZU Tower Sp. z o.o PZU Ukraine; PZU Zdrowie SA
- Website: www.pzu.pl

Powszechny Zakład Ubezpieczeń Spółka Akcyjna, also known as PZU SA (Polish pronunciation: [pɔfʂɛxnɨ zakwat ubɛspiɛt͡ʂɛɲ]) (WSE: PZU) (meaning: General Insurance Institution) is a publicly traded insurance company, a component of the WIG30 stock market index and Poland's biggest and oldest insurance company. PZU is headquartered in Warsaw and is the largest financial institution in Poland. It is also the largest insurance company in Central and Eastern Europe.

PZU Group offers a selection of nearly 200 insurance products on the Polish market. The activities of PZU group encompass a comprehensive range of insurance and financial services. The Group entities provide services in the areas of non-life insurance, personal and life insurance, investment funds and open pension fund.

== History ==
=== Foundation ===
The company's origin dates back to 1803 when the first insurance company in Poland was established. In the years 1927-1952 the company operated under the name Powszechny Zakład Ubezpieczeń Wzajemnych. From 1952 to 1990 it was operated as a state-owned monopoly under the name Państwowy Zakład Ubezpieczeń (State Insurance Company) and effectively became the largest insurance company in the country.

In 1991 PZU was turned into a joint stock company controlled by the State Treasury as a consequence of the political transformation after 1989.

In December 1991, the PZU Życie joint stock company was founded by Polski Bank Rozwoju and Bank Handlowy in Warsaw. PZU transferred its portfolio of life insurance contracts to PZU Życie.

In 1998, in relation with the reform of the pension insurance system in Poland, PZU Życie formed PTE PZU, a joint stock company, which operates the OFE PZU (Open Pension Fund).

On 5 November 1999, a share purchase agreement was concluded under which Eureko and BIG Bank Gdański acquired 20% and 10% respectively of the share capital of PZU. A dispute arose in connection with the implementation of the agreement, which was settled amicably in October 2009. Settlement and sale agreements were concluded between the parties.

=== In the 21st century ===
In 2002, the PZU Group started its activities on the Lithuanian insurance market by acquiring shares in UAB DK “Lindra” (PZU Lietuva). With the acquisition in OAO “Skide West” (PZU Ukraina) in 2005, it began operations on the Ukrainian market again.

In the first half of 2008 PZU Group received 11,882.5 million Polish zloty in insurance premiums. This is an increase of 50.6% over the same period in 2007.

PZU was first quoted on the Warsaw Stock Exchange in May 2010.

In 2010 PZU was fined three times by the Polish Financial Supervision Authority for a total of 330,000 PLN.

In 2011, the company received the Jakość Obsługi 2011 Award (Quality of Service Award) and was among the three top insurance companies in the country alongside Allianz and Ergo Hestia.

In March 2014, it was revealed that PZU and Vienna Insurance Group were in the race to acquire rival Lietuvos Draudimas for around $147 million. In 2015 PZU acquired the direct insurer LINK4 in Poland and launched the PZU Zdrowie brand. In the same year, PZU acquired the Baltic businesses of the British RSA Insurance Group for some €360 million. This deal enabled the company to take control of Lithuania’s biggest insurer, Lietuvos Draudimas, Latvian rival AAS Balta, an Estonian unit of RSA’s Danish insurer Codan Forsikring.

In 2015, the transaction to acquire a 25.19% stake in the share capital of Alior Bank SA was completed. The next step was the transaction carried out by Alior Bank to acquire a separate part of Bank BPH, including the core business.

Currently, the PZU SA Group holds 31.94% of shares of the Alior Bank. In December 2016, PZU together with Polish Development Fund acquired Bank Pekao, Poland's second largest bank previously owned by UniCredit, by buying a 32.8 per cent stake in the bank for the amount of PLN 10.6 billion (EUR 2.6 billion).

In 2020, PZU became the first Polish insurer to use artificial intelligence technology developed by Tractable in order to enhance how it reviews its car insurance claims across the country.

In February 2022, in the wake of the Russian invasion of Ukraine, PZU initiated a special programme for Ukrainian citizens who have crossed the Polish border and did not have the mandatory automobile insurance. The company decided to contribute the auto insurance premiums for Ukrainian citizens for a 30-day period.

In September 2022, PZU became the first insurance company to sign an agreement with the Swedish-based Insurtech Upptec in order to launch automated, digital claims and to accelerate customer experience and optimize claims processing.

Since August 2022, PZU is a member of the United Nations Global Compact, a pact of the United Nations to help businesses be more sustainable.

In June 2025, PZU and Polish lender Bank Pekao agreed agreed a potential merger plan in order to create a €23 billion financial firm.

== Corporate affairs ==
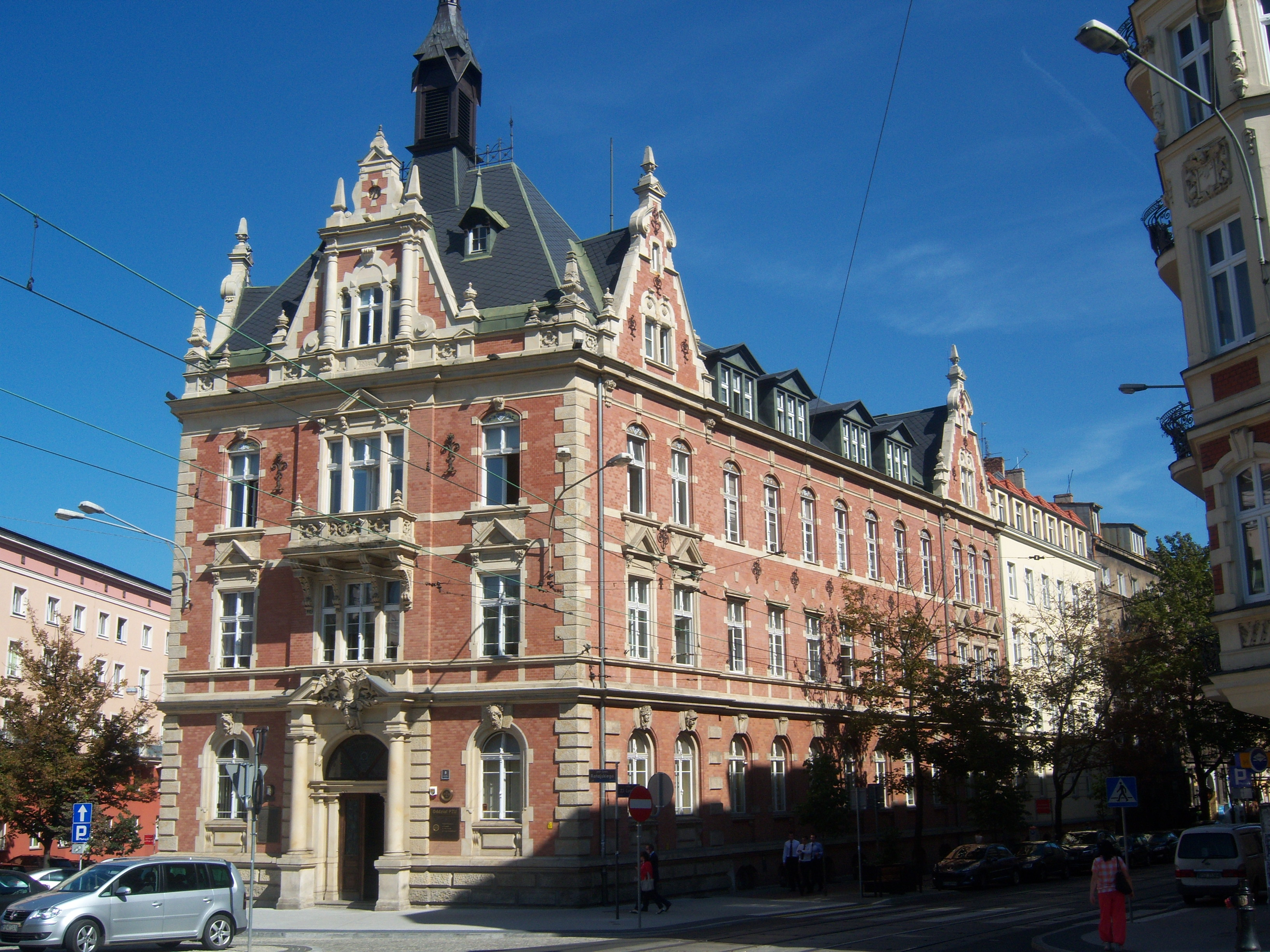
PZU branch in Poznań

=== Organizational structure ===
The PZU Group currently comprises a total of 88 companies, some of which include:

- Powszechny Zakład Ubezpieczeń na Życie SA
- Powszechne Towarzystwo Emerytalne PZU SA
- Towarzystwo Funduszy Inwestycyjnych PZU SA
- PZU Pomoc SA
- PZU Centrum Operacji SA
- PZU Tower Sp. z o.o.
- PZU Asset Management Sp. z o.o.
- Międzyzakładowe Pracownicze Towarzystwo Emerytalne PZU S.A.
- PZU Lietuva (Lithuania)
- PZU Ukraine
- Apdrošināšanas Akciju Sabiedrība Balta (Latvia)
- PZU Finance AB (Sweden)
- LLC SOS Services (Ukraine)
- Ogrodowa – Inwestycje Sp. z.o.o.
- Alior Bank (31.91% stake)
- Bank Pekao (20% stake)

=== Management ===
List of Presidents of the Management Board:

- Anatol Adamski, 1985-1990
- Krzysztof Jarmuszczak, 1990-1993
- Roman Fulneczek, 1993-1996
- Jan Monkiewicz, 1996-1997
- Władysław Jamrożyk, 1997-2000
- Jerzy Zdrzałka, 2000-2001
- Władysław Bartoszewicz, 2001
- Marek Mroczkiewicz (acting), 2001
- Zygmunt Kostkiewicz, 2001-2002
- Zdzisław Montkiewicz, 2002-2003
- Cezary Stypułkowski, 2003-2006
- Piotr Kowalczewski (acting), 2006
- Jaromir Netzel, 2006-2007
- Agata Rowińska, 2007
- Andrzej Klesyk, 2007-2015, 2025
- Dariusz Krzewina (acting), 2015-2016
- Michał Krupiński, 2016-2017
- Marcin Chludziński (acting), 2017
- Paweł Surówka, 2017-2020
- Beata Kozłowska-Chyła (acting) 2007, 2020-2024
- Anita Elżanowska (acting), 2024
- Artur Olech, 2024-2025
- Tomasz Tarkowski (acting), 2025
- Bogdan Benczak, 2025-present

=== PZU Group's operations ===
- Non-life insurance
- Life insurance
- Banking
- Mutual funds
- Pension funds
- International operations
- Medical services (Health)

== Products and services ==
The PZU Group offers insurance services in the areas of property, accident and life insurance. PZU also provides pension fund management, investment fund management, pension fund settlement services, national investment fund asset management, and insurance and financial brokerage services. The company is structured into two divisions: PZU and PZU Zycie. PZU in turn is divided into three segments: Corporate Insurance, Personal Insurance and Investment Activities. The segments Corporate Insurance and Private Customer Insurance are active in personal and property insurance. The Investing activities segment comprises investments with own funds. PZU Zycie deals with group insurance, individual continued insurance, individual life insurance, investment activities and investment contracts. PZU Zycie also provides other financial services such as investment and construction products through various distribution channels.

== Sport sponsorship ==
From 2021 to 2024, PZU Group was the official partner of Polish tennis player Iga Świątek.

== See also ==
- List of Polish companies
