= Zume =

US robot pizza and packaging company

Coordinates: 37.398925°N 122.083925°W

Zume, Inc.

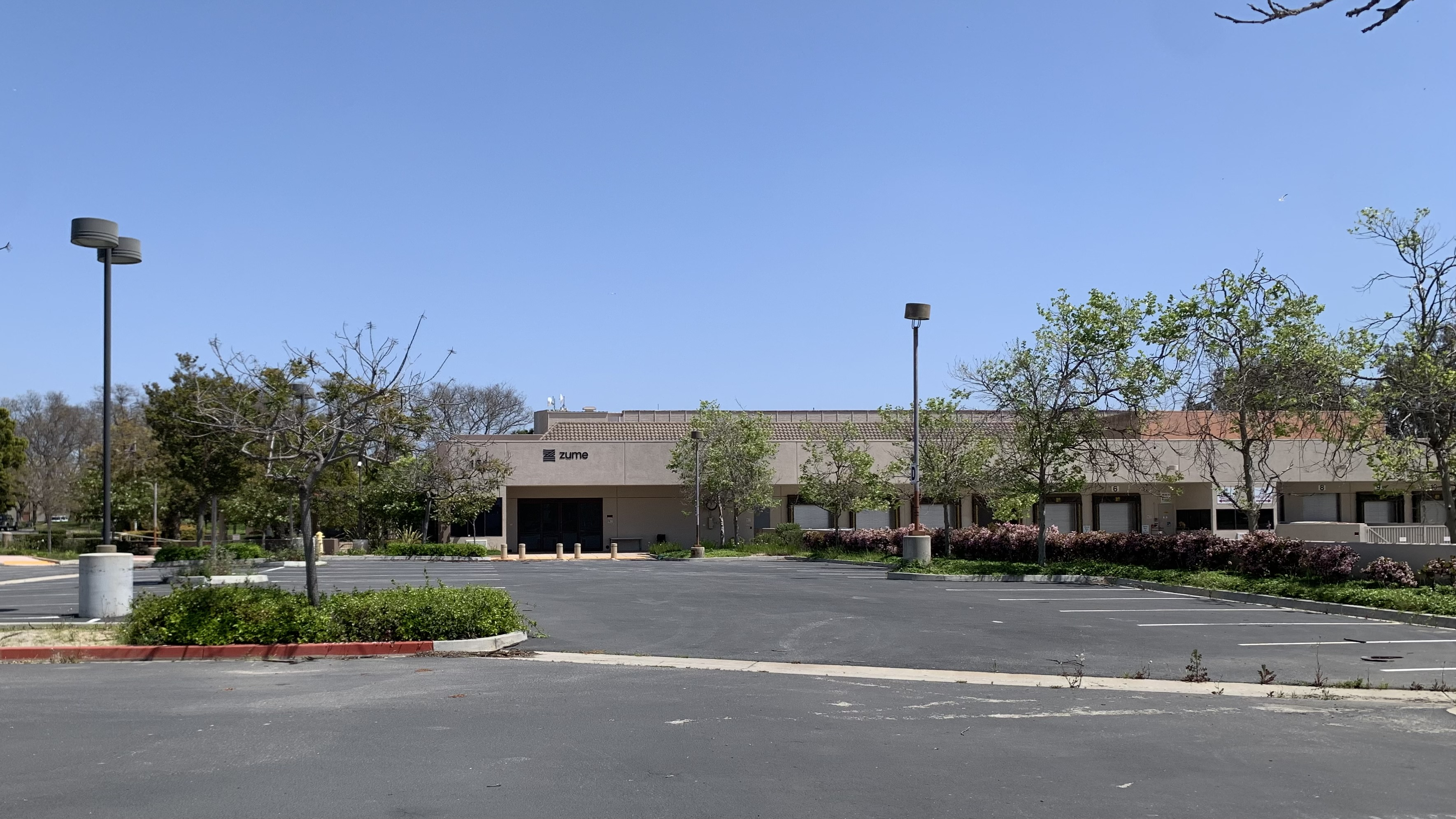
- Former headquarters of Zume
- Type: Private
- Industry: Manufacturing, Food technology, Food delivery, Automation, Food packaging
- Founded: 2015; 11 years ago
- Founders: Alex Garden; Julia Collins
- Defunct: June 2023; 3 years ago
- Headquarters: Camarillo, California, United States
- Area served: Worldwide
- Key people: Alex Garden
- Products: Sustainable products, Packaging

Zume, Inc. was an American manufacturing-technology company headquartered in Camarillo, California. Founded in 2015 as an automated pizza parlor, in 2020 the company shifted to food packaging and delivery logistics. In June 2023, the company was shut down.

== History ==
Zume was founded in 2015 as Zume Pizza by Chairman and CEO Alex Garden and Julia Collins. In 2016, it raised $6 million in Series A investment funding from Jerry Yang and SignalFire, a venture capital firm.

Zume's initial business proposition was the automated production and delivery of pizza, which would largely be made by robots and cooked en route to customers. In September 2016, it delivered its first pizzas. They were cooked in a van equipped with 56 GPS-equipped automated ovens, timed to be ready shortly before arrival at the address, and then sliced by a self-cleaning robot cutter. The pizza preparation process was partly automated by November 2016.

The company secured a patent on cooking during delivery, which included algorithms to predict customer choices, and planned to partner with businesses to provide other robot-prepared meal components, such as salads and desserts. In fall 2017, Zume raised $48 million in Series B funding.

Baking pizzas in a moving vehicle proved to be impractical, and customers complained about quality problems with the robot-made pizzas; the idea was eventually shelved.

=== Zume, Inc. ===
By 2018, the company announced that it would move away from pizza and make use of artificial intelligence and kitchen technology to become a platform for automated food trucks and would form a larger umbrella company, Zume, Inc. In April 2018, the company announced that it would begin to license its automation technology. It subsequently also began selling food packaging; it holds patents for sustainable food-delivery boxes. It projected revenues of $250 million and $1 billion in the final quarters of 2020 and 2021, respectively. In November 2018, the company raised $375 million from SoftBank, giving it a valuation of $2.25 billion. It subsequently focused on automated production and packaging for other food companies, and in 2019 it bought Pivot, a company which made plant-based packaging.

The company sought a valuation of $4 billion in 2019 and generated significant public attention. Its packaging could not legally hold food in some jurisdictions, including San Francisco, because it contained PFAS, which are chemicals considered harmful to humans by the EPA. In 2020, the founders of Pivot, which Zume acquired, claimed the company was incorrectly valued at the time they were purchased for $20.5 million, which purportedly included $10 million in stock. By May 2020, the company started manufacturing compostable food packaging. In 2020 it laid off more than 500 employees including its entire robotics and delivery truck departments. In June 2023, the company was shut down.
