= Generation Park =

Complex of three office buildings in Warsaw, Poland

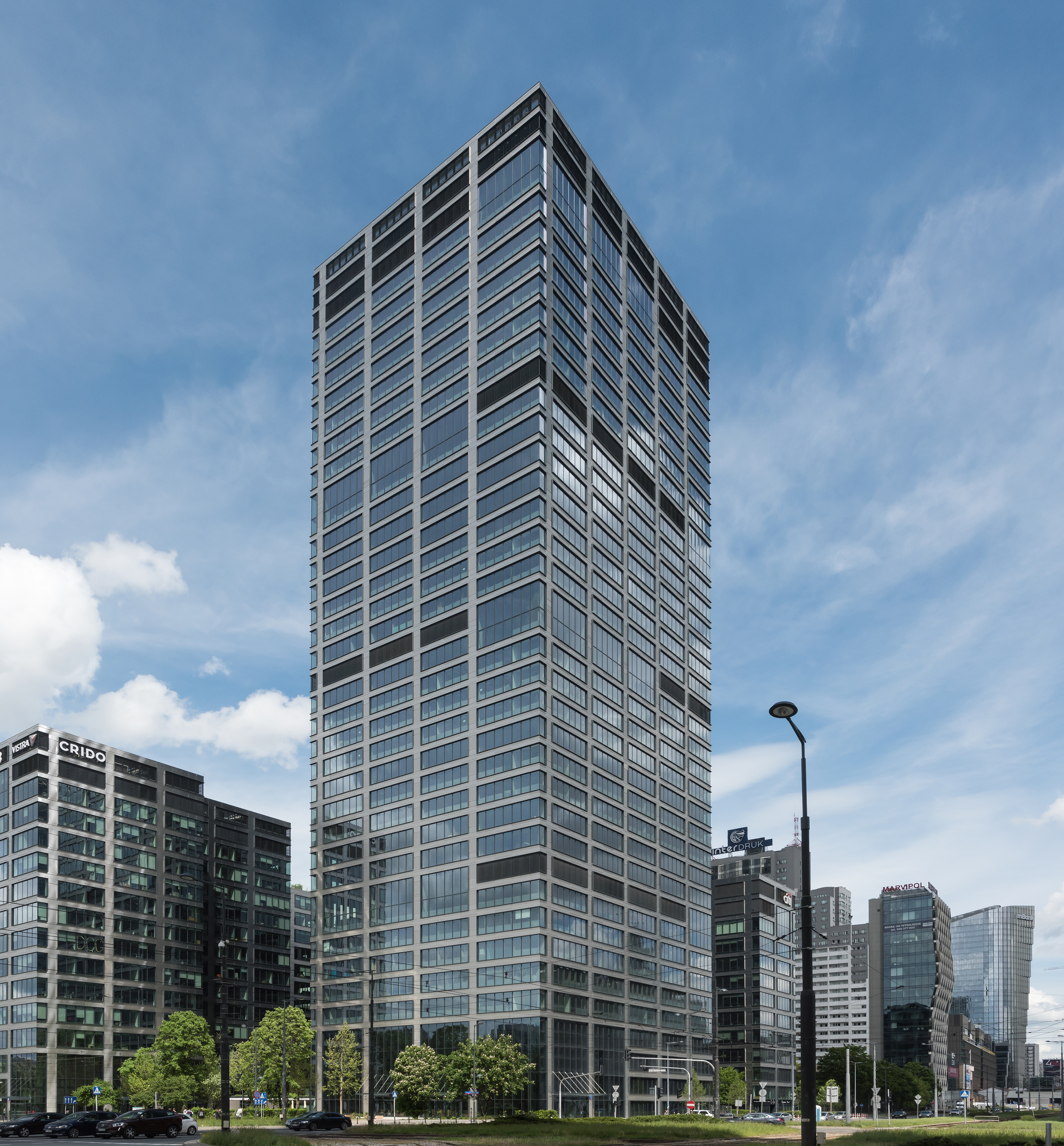
- The complex in 2021.
- Interactive map of the Generation Park area

General information
- Type: Office skyscraper
- Architectural style: Neomodern
- Location: Wola, Warsaw, Poland, 26 Prosta Street (X); 4 Daszyński Roundabout (Y); 28 Towarowa Street (Z)
- Coordinates: 52°13′52.18″N 20°59′05.86″E
- Construction started: November 2015
- Completed: January 2021
- Owner: Hansainvest Real Assets (X and Y); Deka Immobilien (Z)

Height
- Roof: 140 m (Y)

Technical details
- Floor count: 38 (Y); 11 (X and Z)
- Floor area: 84,000 m^{2} (total); 47,000 m^{2} (Y); 21,000 m^{2} (X); 19,000 m^{2} (Z)

Design and construction
- Architecture firm: JEMS Architekci
- Developer: Skanska Property Poland
- Main contractor: Skanska Property Poland

The Generation Park is a neomodern complex of three office buildings in Warsaw, Poland, within the neighbourhood of Mirów in the district of Wola. It includes a 38-storey-tall skyscraper at 4 Daszyński Roundabout, and two 11-storey buildings at 36 Prosta Street and 28 Towarowa Street. The complex was constructed between 2015 and 2021, and designed by architecture firm JEMS Architekci.

== History ==
The complex, consisting of buildings designated with letters X, Y, and Z, was constructed between November 2015 and January 2021, with the Skanska Property Poland as the investor and main contractor. It was designed by architecture firm JEMS Architekci. The complex was built in place of the former office buildings of Prasa-Książka-Ruch and the Institute of National Remembrance.

The Generation Park X was sold to Hansainvest Real Assets in November 2017, and the Generation Park Z, to Deka Immobilien in March 2020.

Uppon opening in 2021, the skyscraper Generation Park Y was titled the most eco-friendly building in the city, and also received award Prime Property in said category. In December 2022, it was sold to Hansainvest Real Assets for 285 million euros, and June 2022, it was rented in its entirety as the headquarters of the Powszechny Zakład Ubezpieczeń.

== Architecture ==
The complex consists of three office buildings, designated with letters X, Y, and Z, in reference to the human generations. It has the total floor area of 84,000 m^{2}.

The tallest of them is the skyscraper Generation Park Y, at 4 Daszyński Roundabout with 38 storeys, and additional 4 underground levels. It has the height of 140 m, and the total floor area of 47 000 m^{2}.

It is accompanied with two smaller eleven-storey buildings, Generation Park X at 36 Prosta Street, and Generation Park Z at 28 Towarowa Street. The prior has the floor area of 21,000 m^{2}, and the latter, of 19,000 m^{2}.
