= EnvisionTEC =

3D printer company

- Type: Private
- Founded: 2002
- Area served: Worldwide
- Key people: Al Siblani (CEO)
- Products: Desktop 3D printers Production 3D printers 3D bioprinters Robotic 3D printers Rapid prototyping solutions Direct digital manufacturing
- Website: envisiontec.com

EnvisionTEC was a privately held global company that developed, manufactured and sold more than 40 configurations of desktop and production 3D printers based on seven several distinct process technologies. The company filed for bankruptcy in July 2025 and was subsequently sold.

Founded in 2002, the company now has a corporate headquarters for North America, located in Dearborn, Mich., and International headquarters in Gladbeck, Germany. It also has a production facility in the Greater Los Angeles area, as well as additional facilities in Montreal, for materials research, in Kyiv, Ukraine, for software development, and in Woburn, Mass, for robotic 3D printing research and development. Today, the company's 3D Printers are used for mass customized production and to manufacture finished goods, investment casting patterns, tooling, prototypes and more. EnvisionTEC serves a variety of medical, professional and industrial customers. EnvisionTEC has developed large customer niches in the jewelry, dental, hearing aid, medical device, biofabrication and animation industries.

== Technology ==
Since it filed its first patent in 1999, EnvisionTEC has developed and brought to market several new additive manufacturing technologies used for 3D printing.

Three of those technologies are based on harnessing light as a tool to cure liquid resin into a three-dimensional object based on a digital design files.

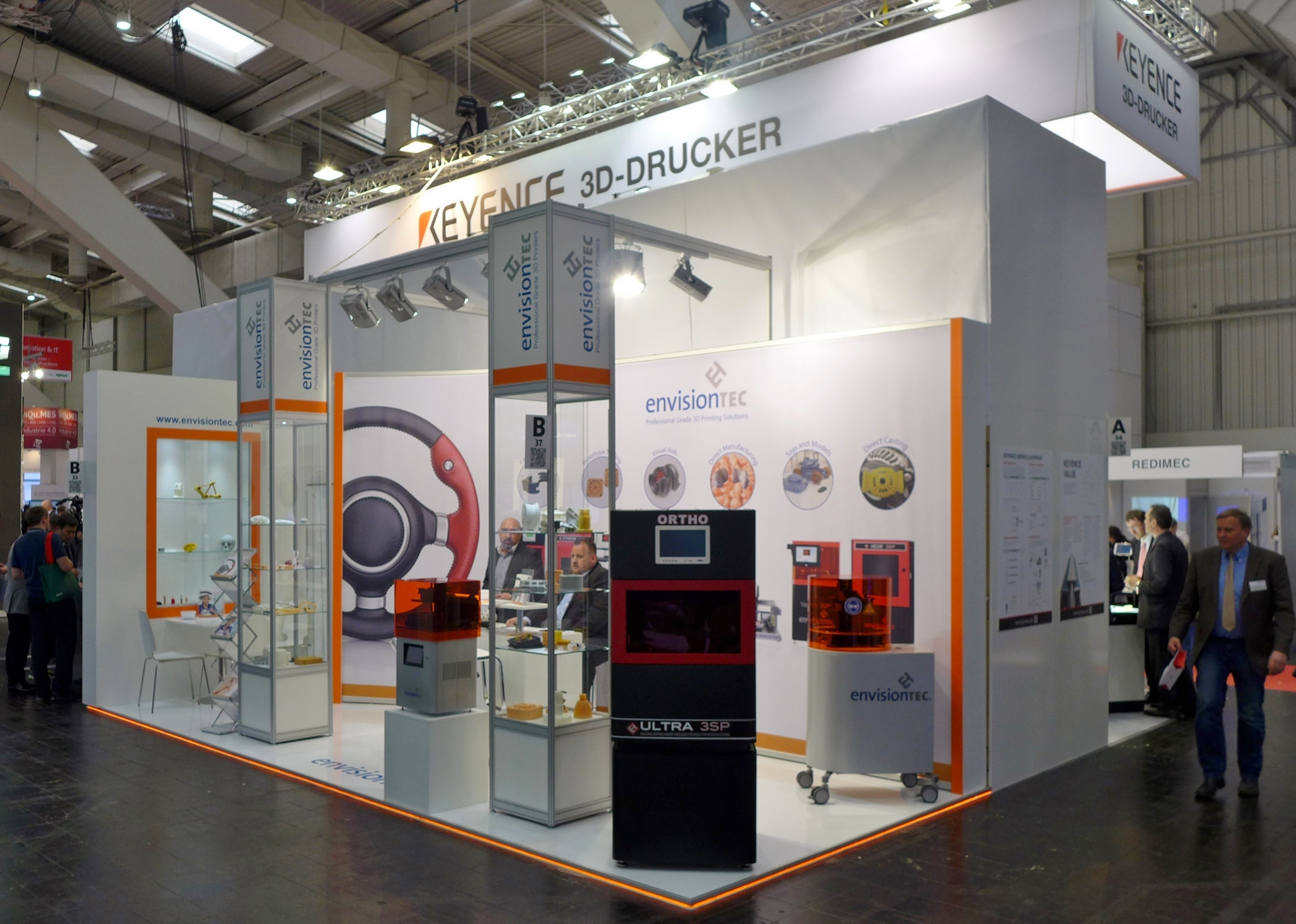
The EnvisionTEC stand at the Hannover Messe 2016

- In 2002, EnvisionTEC started producing Perfactory printers using Texas Instruments DLP projectors. In this process, a vat of liquid photopolymer or resin is cured by projecting images from a digital light source to solidify the photopolymer voxel by voxel, resulting in a solid object. This DLP 3D printing process allows for extremely high resolution, excellent surface finish, and intricate details, making it a popular technology among makers of products requiring high resolution, excellent surface finish and intricate details.
- Because the resolution delivered by DLP technologies begins to taper off as the size of the final object grows, or the light source moves away from the part being built, EnvisionTEC later developed Scan, Spin and Selectively Photocure (3SP) technology, which launched in 2013 to 3D print larger objects while maintaining quality. With 3SP, a multi-cavity laser diode with an orthogonal mirror spinning at 20,000 rpm reflects the beam through a spinning drum, where the light passes through a series of optical elements, focusing the light onto the surface of the photopolymer across the Y direction. An Imaging Light Source (ILS) contains a multi-cavity laser diode, its driver, and all optics. The ILS travels in the X direction at 1-2 inches per second, depending on the material being cured, while the laser light scans the Y direction and selectively photo-cures liquid resin based on the data path.
- In June 2016, EnvisionTEC unveiled another patented breakthrough—Continuous Digital Light Manufacturing (cDLM) technology—with the launch of the Micro Plus cDLM at the JCK Las Vegas tradeshow. EnvisionTEC first filed for a patent on its Continuous Digital Light Manufacturing technology in 2006, and a patent was issued in 2011. The CLDM technology allows continuous movement of the build platform in the Z axis, which allows for faster build speeds and isotropic properties in the Z axis that allow 3D printed parts to compete more directly with injection molded parts. Together, the fast build times and isotropic nature of the builds also opens the door for new dual-cure materials that were previously not possible with standard DLP printing. By the end of 2017, EnvisionTEC's family of cDLM printers had grown to include the Micro cDLM, the Vida HD cDLM and the Vida cDLM, with each printer offering unique features for jewelry, dental and manufacturing customers.

EnvisionTEC has also been developing and expanding its process technology beyond DLP and light-based curing technologies, too.

The company's 3D-Bioplotter series now includes a Starter, Developer and Manufacturing model that extrude materials in three dimensions using pressure. Materials range from a viscous paste to a liquid, and are inserted using syringes moving in three dimensions. Air or mechanical pressure is applied to the syringe, which then deposits a strand of material for the length of movement and time the pressure is applied. Parallel strands are plotted in one layer. For the following layer, the direction of the strands is turned over the center of the object, creating a fine mesh with good mechanical properties and mathematically well-defined porosity. The 3D-Bioplotter is frequently used in biofabrication and is being used in a wide range of medical research. Scientists from Northwestern University, for example, have created 3D printed ovary implants using an EnvisionTEC 3D-Bioplotter that may be used one day to treat women experiencing infertility.

== Products ==
EnvisionTEC sold more than 40 configurations of 3D Printers that sell for between $6,299 and $1 million. The company's printers were organized into several families of printers: Desktops (Aria, Micro, Vida, Aureus, etc.); Perfactory; cDLM; 3SP; 3D-Bioplotter; and the SLCOM. EnvisionTEC also marketed and sold the Viridis3D RAM123 under an "exclusive strategic partnership."

In early 2016, EnvisionTEC demonstrated a shift in its strategic direction with the launch of several new models of printers, including the 3D-Bioplotter Starter Series, the SLCOM 1 and RAM123. "Previously known as pioneers in the 3D printing technology of digital light processing (DLP), the U.S.-German company has managed to redefine itself once again by announcing three new platforms at the event: a new bioprinter, a 3D printer for sandcasting and, perhaps its most substantial unveil, a massive industrial 3D printer dedicated to composite manufacturing," according to Engineering.com.

== See also ==
- Additive manufacturing
- 3D printing
- Rapid prototyping
- List of 3D printer manufacturers
