= Tractable (company) =

UK artificial intelligence company

- Industry: Artificial Intelligence
- Founded: 2014; 12 years ago
- Founder: Alex Dalyac, Razvan Ranca, Adrien Cohen
- Headquarters: New York, NY, United States
- Number of employees: over 300 (2021)
- Website: tractable.ai

Tractable is a technology company specializing in the development of Artificial Intelligence (AI) to assess damage to property and vehicles. The AI allows users to appraise damage digitally.

== Technology ==
Tractable's technology uses computer vision and deep learning to automate the appraisal of visual damage in accident and disaster recovery, for example to a vehicle. Drivers can be directed to use the application by their insurer after an accident, with the aim of settling their claim more quickly. The AI evaluates the damage from images, and therefore doesn't assess what isn't visible (such as, for example, interior damage to a vehicle or property).

== History ==
Alexandre Dalyac and Razvan Ranca founded Tractable in 2014, and Adrien Cohen joined as co-founder in 2015. The company employs more than 300 staff members, largely in the United Kingdom.

Tractable was named one of the 100 leading AI companies in the world in 2020 and 2021 by CB Insights. It won the Best Technology Award in the 2020 British Insurance Awards.

In June 2021, Tractable announced a venture round that valued the company at $1 billion. Tractable was the UK's 100th billion-dollar tech company, or unicorn.

In July 2023, the company received a $65 million investment from SoftBank Group, through its Vision Fund 2.
