= Oil industry in Poland =

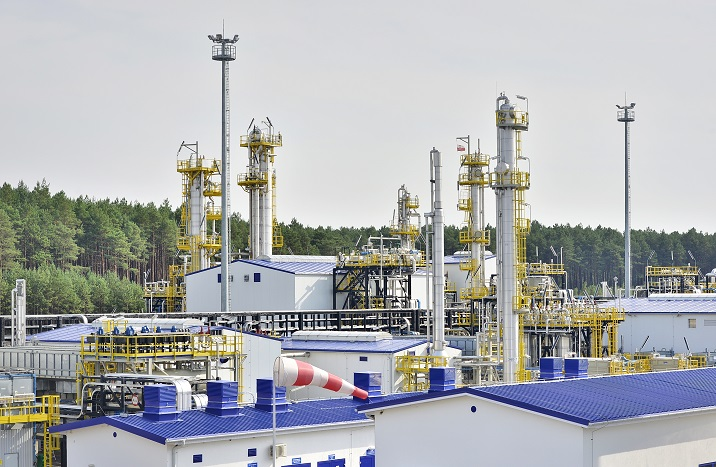
Oil and natural gas mine in Lubiatów

The oil industry in Poland began at Bóbrka Field in 1853, followed by the first refinery in 1854. Poland was the third most productive region in the world in 1900. It now has only a small, mostly state-owned component, with production from its Permian Basin in the west, small and very old fields in the Carpathians in the south, and offshore in the Baltic Sea.

== Shale gas and tight oil ==
Production of significant quantities of natural gas or petroleum from shale or tight (low permeability) reservoirs is in large part dependent on the social acceptance and technical and commercial viability of hydraulic fracturing. As of 2013 only 3% of the Poles opposed fracking. Leasing for unconventional shale plays in Poland began in 2007. But, as of 2013, the results of exploration efforts, as well as government regulation, have been disappointing, and estimates of the size of the total resource have been substantially reduced. Data indicates a substantial resource, but the permeability of the rocks, combined with the relative complexity of the faulting in some areas, have made success elusive. In 2013, the Energy Information Administration, a U.S. agency, estimated that 146 trillion cubic feet of shale gas and 1.8 billion barrels (290×10^{6} m^{3}) of tight oil could be economically recovered from the shales in Poland using present technology. However, an estimate published in March 2013 of recoverable shale gas reserves by the Polish Geological Institute was 24.8 trillion cubic feet. It remains to be seen whether the lack of reservoir permeability can be overcome.

Poland was dependent on a Soviet era gas pipeline system which brings in only expensive Russian gas. Power generation has been based on Poland's extensive reserves of coal, principally lignite. Development of a domestic gas industry to replace Russian imports is highly desirable as would the use of gas to retire or convert coal fired generation plants. Drilling for shale resources began in June 2010. But, as of July 2013, none of the wells which have been completed have produced gas in commercial quantities. ConocoPhillips, which purchased the most prospective geological area from Lane Energy Poland, was able to produce gas and oil in sustainable volumes. But, their costs were too high to justify the project. ExxonMobil, which positioned itself in the Lublin Basin, a highly faulted area, could never get a sustainable test, despite spending huge sums on geological research. Chevron also stubbed its toe in the Lublin Basin area, after receiving some bad geological advice. Talisman Energy also failed, and Marathon Oil drilled where there was little/no prospective shale resource. All have pulled out, leaving the Polish Oil and Gas Company as the prime company in the shale gas and tight oil plays.

In the absence of regulation acceptable to the drillers who have the technology and resources to engage in extensive exploration, as of 2013, the extent of the tight oil and shale gas resource in Poland remains unknown, although it is believed by some informed observers that it has the potential to supply the needs of Poland for hundreds of year. However, using current technology, it is considered likely that it will be more of a national security mandate than a commercial venture any time soon.

== Polish firms ==
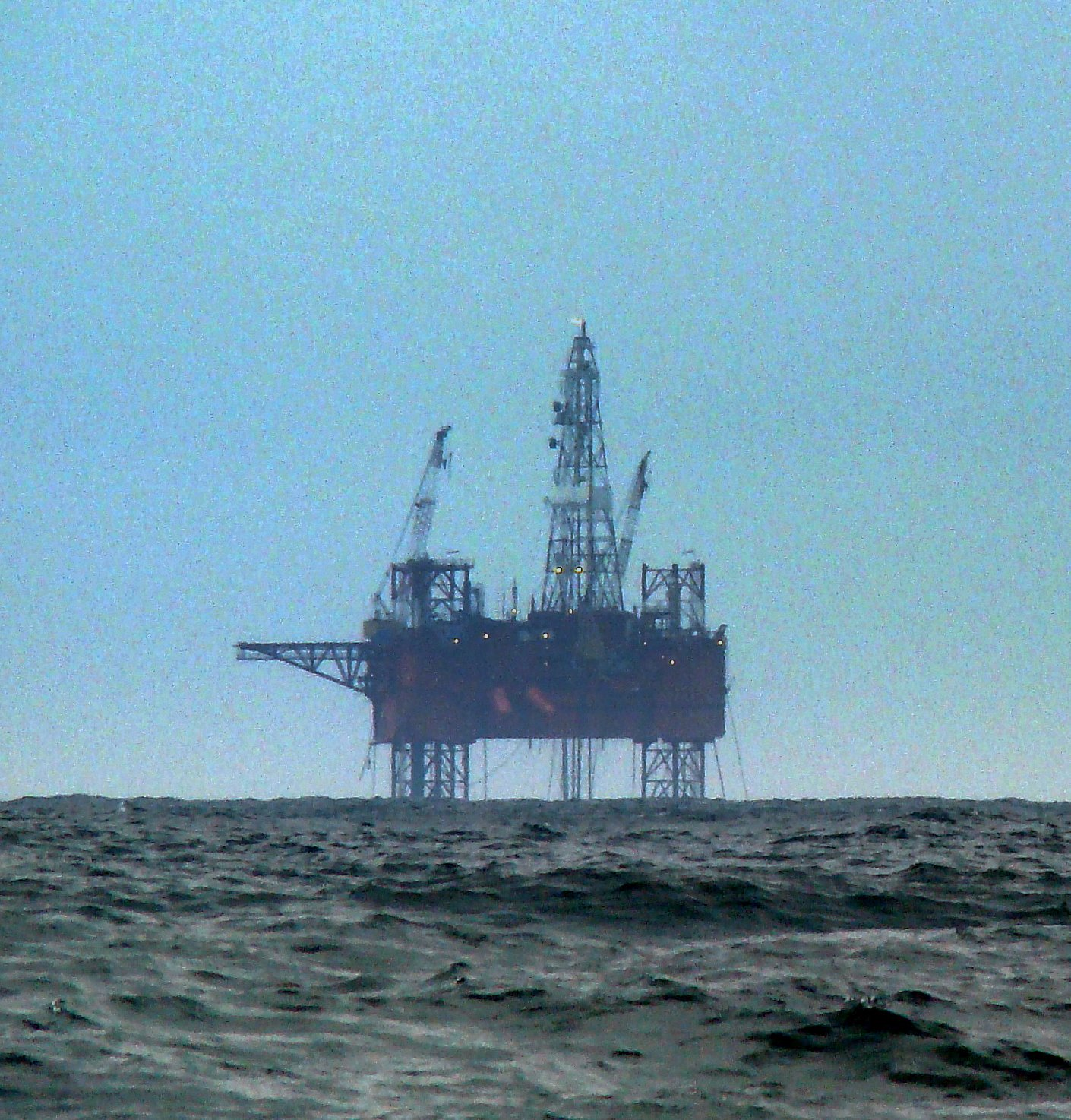
Baltic Beta

In addition to exploration for tight oil and shale gas by international firms there is a small Polish oil and gas industry with some oil and gas production:

- Polskie Górnictwo Naftowe i Gazownictwo (PGNiG, literally: Polish Petroleum and Gas Mining) is a Polish state-controlled oil and natural gas company, which deals with the exploration and production of natural gas and crude oil, natural gas import, storage and distribution and sales of natural gas and crude oil. PGNiG is one of the largest companies in Poland and is listed on the Warsaw Stock Exchange
- Przedsiębiorstwo Poszukiwań i Eksploatacji Złóż Ropy i Gazu "Petrobaltic" S.A. (Exploration and Mining of Petroleum and Gas Deposits Joint stock company "Petrobaltic") was set up in November 1990. On 1 January 1999, the firm was transformed in limited liability company and the only shareholder become the State Treasury. The company is the only firm in Poland performing exploration and production of crude oil and gas in the Baltic Sea. B3 oil field is currently in production and has a 2006 production of 1.9 million bbl/year. The company has its head office in Gdańsk. Exploration and exploitation of oil and gas deposits are performed with three drilling platforms: Petrobaltic, Baltic Beta and Jacket-type platform called "PG-1".

=== Historical firms ===
Polmin (English: State Factory of Mineral Oils, Polish: Panstwowa Fabryka Olejow Mineralnych) was a Polish state-owned enterprise, which controlled excavation, transport and distribution of natural gas. Founded in 1909, it was nationalized in 1927, with main office in Lwów. Polmin operated a large oil refinery in Drohobych, which in late 1930s employed around 3000 people. The refinery purified oil extracted from rich fields of southern part of the Second Polish Republic (Gorlice, Borysław, Jasło, and Drohobych). Some Polish-language sources claim that Polmin refinery in Drohobycz was in late 1930s the biggest in Europe.

== Oil and gas fields in Poland ==
=== Oil fields ===
- The first oil well was drilled at Bóbrka Field in 1853; it was 7 years after drilling the first oil well in Baku settlement (Bibi-Heybat) in 1846 on Apsheron peninsula. The Bóbrka oil mine is a designated Historic Monument of Poland.
- The B3 oil field is an oil and gas field in the Baltic Sea. The field is located 80 km off the Polish coastal town Rozewie. The crude oil is also referred to as Rozewie crude. The API gravity of the crude is 42-43 and sulfur content of 0.12 wt%. The jack up rig Baltic Beta located on the field takes care of processing, drilling and accommodation. The associated gas is sent through a pipeline to the heat and power generating plant in Władysławowo. Most of the oil produced from B3 is shipped by tanker to Gdańsk and fed to the Gdańsk refinery as a small part of the refinery feedstock.
- The B8 oil field is a major oil field in the Polish sector of the Baltic Sea about 70 km north of Jastarnia. The field was discovered in 1983 and started producing oil in 2006. The field currently (2023) accounts for four per cent of Poland’s oil production.
- The Barnówko-Mostno-Buszewo oil field is an oil field that was discovered in 1993. It began production in 1994. Its proven oil reserves are about 90 million barrels (14×10^{6} m^{3}) and proven reserves of natural gas are around 350 billion cubic feet (9.9 billion m³).
- The Dębno oil field is an oil field that was discovered in 2004. It began production in 2005. Its proven oil reserves are about 30 million barrels (4.8×10^{6} m^{3}) and proven reserves of natural gas are around 283 billion cubic feet (8 billion m³).
- The Lubiatów-Międzychód-Grotów oil field is an oil field that was discovered in 1993. It began production in 1994. Its proven oil reserves are about 38 million barrels (6.0×10^{6} m^{3}) and proven reserves of natural gas are around 160 billion cubic feet (4.5 billion m³).

=== Gas fields ===
- The Daszawa gas field was discovered in 1950. It began production in 1950. The proven reserves of natural gas of the Daszawa gas field are around 72 billion cubic feet (2 billion m³).
- The Dzików gas field, discovered in 1962, began production in 1965. Proven reserves are about 70 billion cubic feet (2 billion m³).
- Jasionka
- Jodłówka
- Kościan
- Przemyśl
- Radlin
- Terliczka
- Wola Obszańska
- Żołynia

== Refining, distribution, and retailing ==
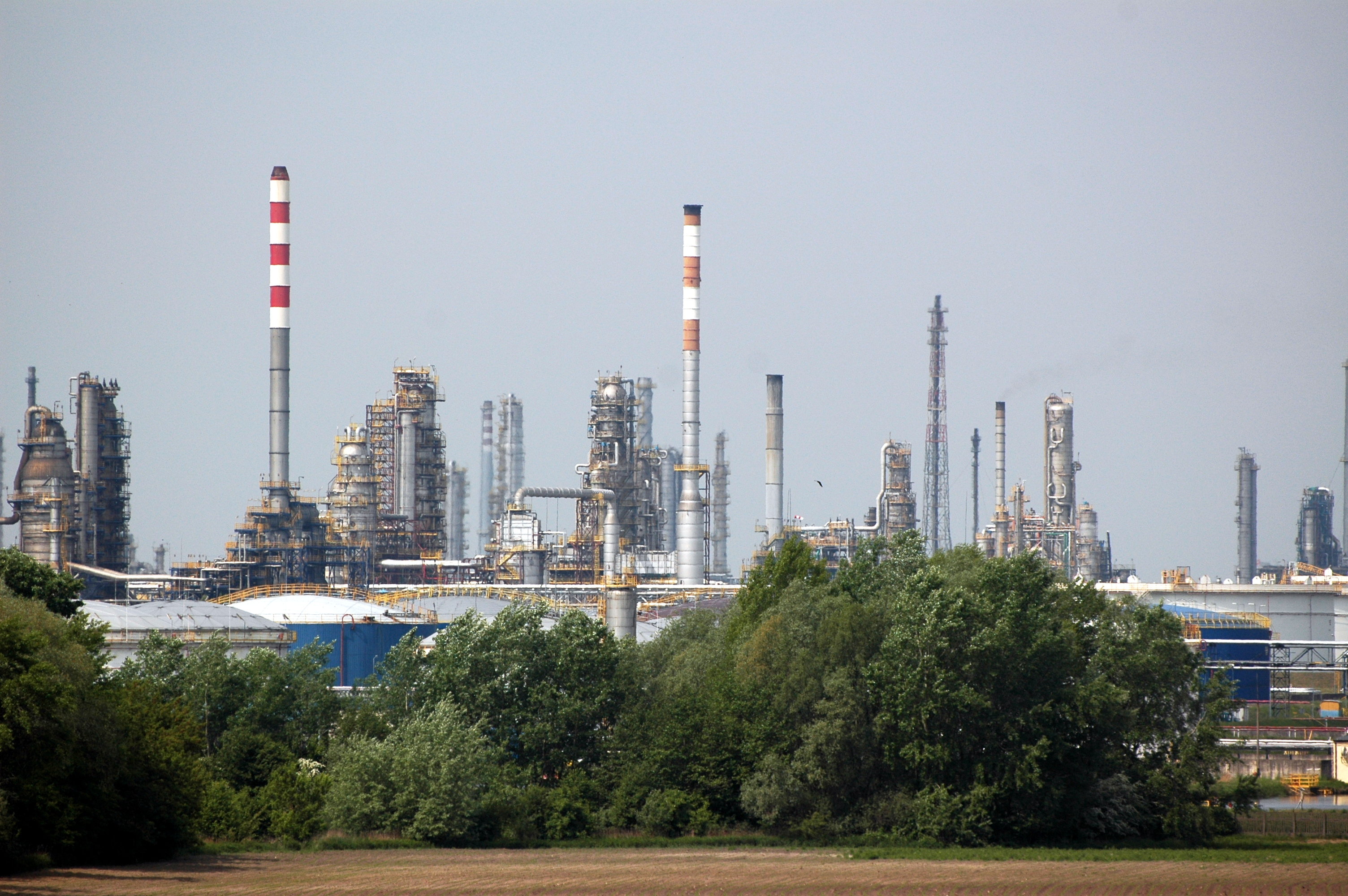
Płock refinery

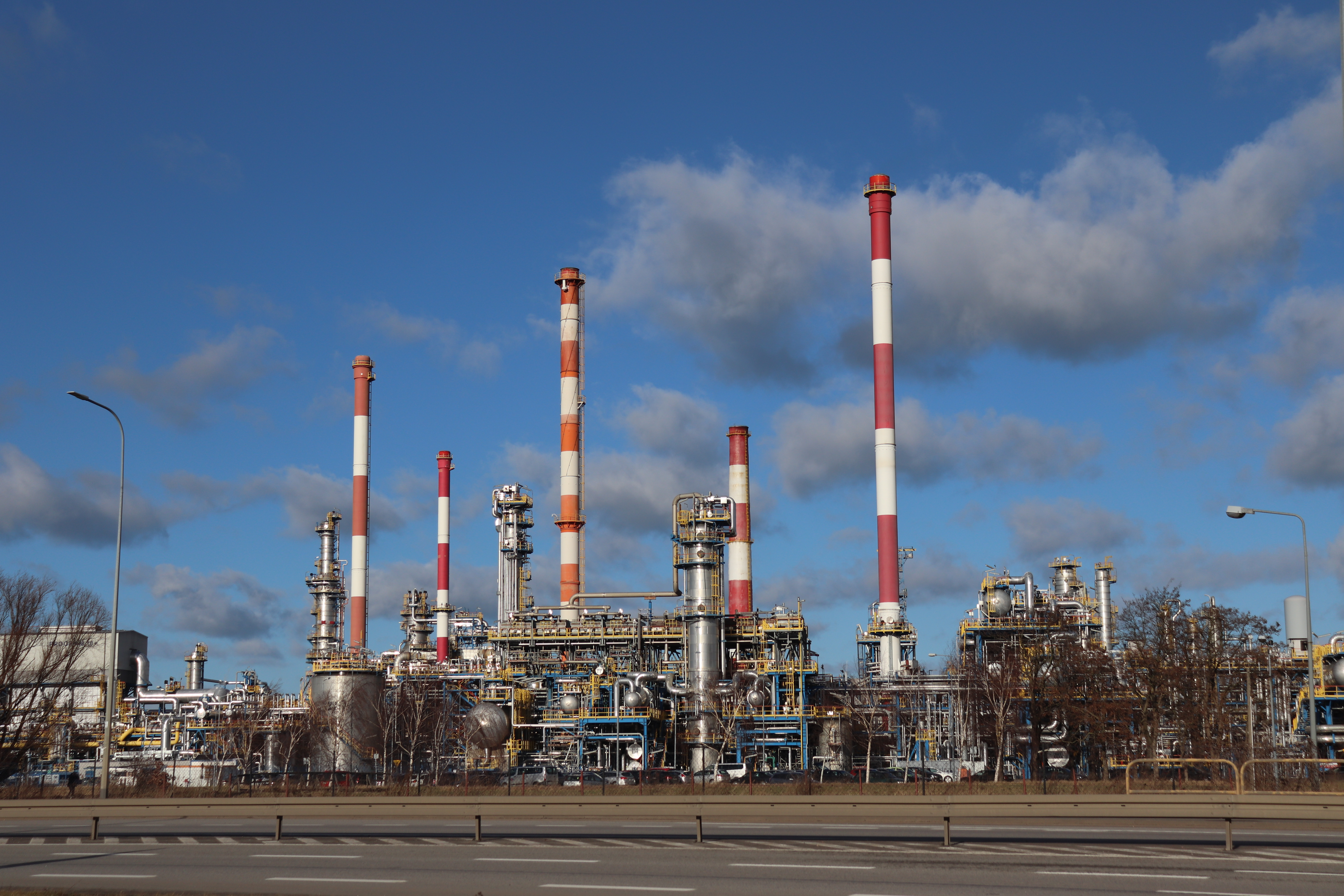
Gdańsk Refinery

- Grupa Lotos S.A. was a vertically integrated oil company based in Gdańsk. The company is listed in the Polish index WIG 20. Its main activity branches were: crude oil production, refining and marketing of oil products. The company was a leader in lubricants on the Polish market. Grupa Lotos was a producer of unleaded gasoline, diesel, fuel oils, aviation fuels, motor and industrial lubricants, bitumens and waxes. It merged with PKN Orlen in 2022.
- PKN Orlen (Polish: Polski Koncern Naftowy Orlen) (WSE: PKN) is a major Polish oil refiner, and petrol retailer. The company is the Central Europe's largest publicly traded firm with major operations in Poland, Czech Republic, Germany, Slovakia, and the Baltic States. In 2009, it was ranked in the Fortune Global 500 as the world's 31st largest oil company and the world's 249th largest company overall, and was the only Polish company ranked by Fortune. It currently (2012) ranks 297th, with a revenue of over US$36.1 billion.
  - The Płock refinery is an oil refinery and petrochemical complex in Płock owned by PKN Orlen. The refinery has a Nelson complexity index of 9.5 and a capacity is 276 kbpd of crude oil.
  - The Gdańsk refinery is an oil refinery located in Gdańsk formerly owned by Grupa Lotos, since 2022 owned by PKN Orlen. The refinery capacity is 210 kbpd of crude oil and it has a Nelson complexity index of 11.1.
- Gaz-System, Operator Gazociągów Przesyłowych GAZ-SYSTEM S.A., is a designated natural gas transmission system operator in Poland. The company was established on 16 April 2004 as a wholly owned subsidiary of PGNiG under the name PGNiG – Przesył Sp. z o.o. On 28 April 2005, all shares of the company were transferred to the State Treasury of Poland and the current name of the company was adopted on 8 June 2005. Gaz-System owns and operates all gas transmission and distribution pipelines in Poland, except the Yamal–Europe pipeline owned by EuRoPol Gaz S.A. The company is also responsible for construction of the Polskie LNG terminal at Świnoujście and the Baltic Pipe pipeline between Poland and Denmark.
- Naftoport Ltd (Polish: NAFTOPORT Sp. z o.o.) is a company which manages crude oil shipment and deliveries. It is located in Gdańsk. Naftoport Ltd was established in June 1991 by several Polish oil companies and Marine Commercial Port in Gdańsk. The company oversees operations of the terminal for reloading of crude oil and products in Port of Gdańsk.
- PERN Przyjazn SA (Polish: Przedsiębiorstwo Eksploatacji Rurociągów Naftowych "Przyjaźń" Spółka Akcyjna), joint stock Oil Pipeline Operation Company "Przyjaźń" is one of leading companies for oil transportation and storage in Poland. The company is based in Płock and overlooks catering of oil and gas through Poland to eastern European markets.

=== Pipelines from the former Soviet Union ===
- The Druzhba pipeline (Russian: нефтепровод «Дружба»; also has been referred to as the Friendship Pipeline and the Comecon Pipeline) is the world's longest oil pipeline and in fact one of the biggest oil pipeline networks in the world. It carries oil some 4,000 kilometres (2,500 mi) from the eastern part of the European Russia to points in Ukraine, Belarus, Poland, Hungary, Slovakia, the Czech Republic and Germany. The network also branches out into numerous pipelines to deliver its product throughout the Eastern Europe and beyond. The name "Druzhba" means "friendship", alluding to the fact that the pipeline supplied oil to the energy-hungry western regions of the Soviet Union, to its "fraternal socialist allies" in the former Soviet bloc, and to western Europe. Today, it is the largest principal artery for the transportation of Russian (and Kazakh) oil across Europe.
- The Odesa–Brody pipeline (also known as Sarmatia pipeline) is a crude oil pipeline between the Ukrainian cities Odesa at the Black Sea, and Brody near the Ukrainian-Polish border. There are plans to expand the pipeline to Płock, and furthermore to Gdańsk in Poland. The pipeline is operated by UkrTransNafta, Ukraine's state-owned oil pipeline company.
- The Yamal–Europe pipeline is a 4,196 kilometres (2,607 mi) long pipeline connecting natural gas fields in Western Siberia and in the future on the Yamal peninsula, Russia, with Germany.
- Polski Gaz Sp z o. o. is a distributor of liquefied petroleum gas: propane and butane. Petrochemical Holding GMBH holds 100% share in Polski Gaz Sp. z o.o.

== Protest ==
During summer 2013 "Occupy Chevron" protesters occupied the field near Żurawlów in the Grabowiec district where Chevron Corporation planned to drill an exploratory well. This type of activity is becoming more common.

== External links and further reading ==
- History of Polish Gas Industry
- Mir-Babayev M.F. Brief history of the first drilled oil well; and people involved - "Oil-Industry History" (USA), 2017, v.18, #1, p. 25-34.
