= Gdańsk Refinery =

Oil refinery in Gdańsk, Poland

Gdańsk oil refinery
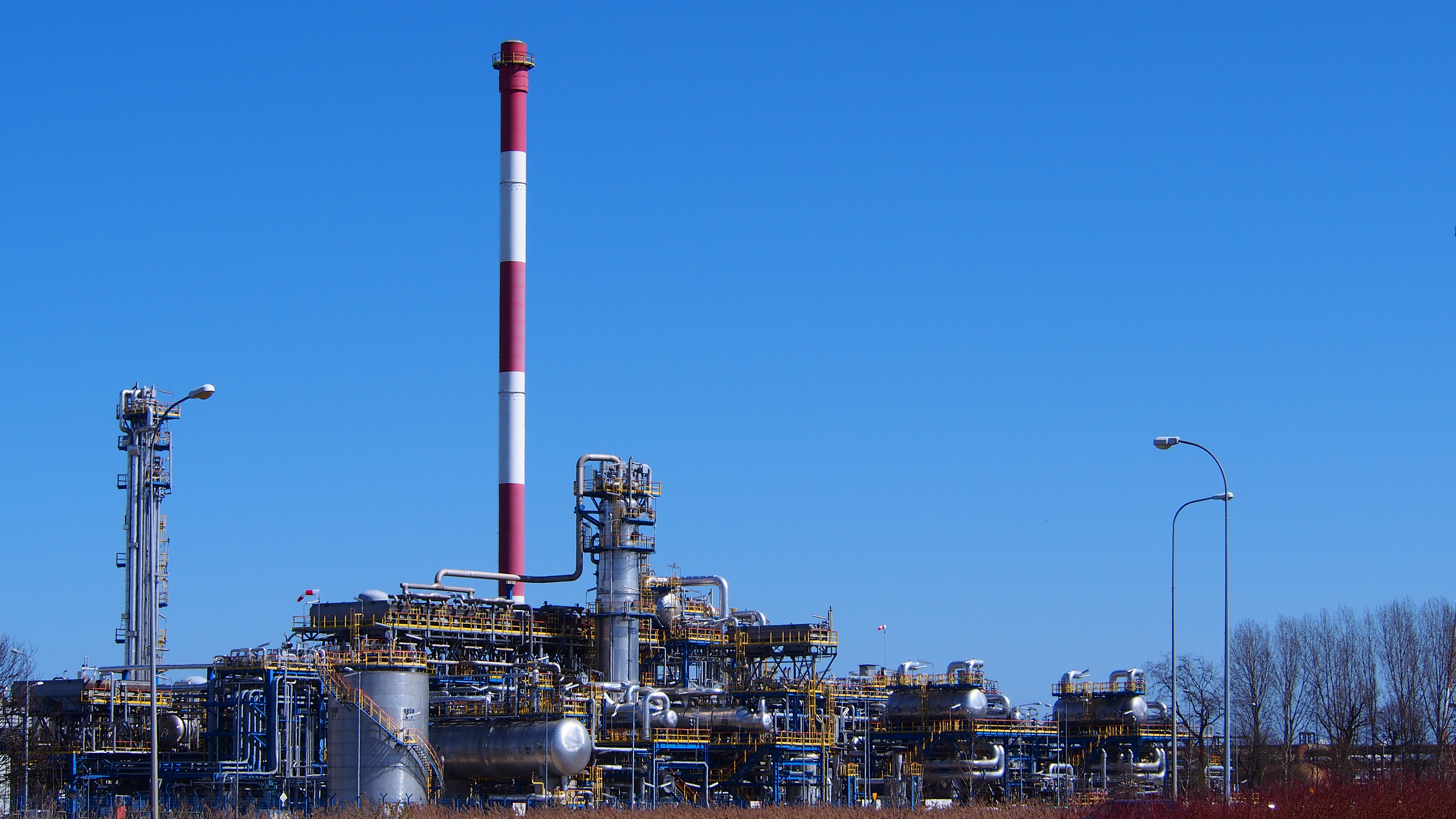
- Interactive map of Gdańsk oil refinery
- Location: Gdańsk, Pomeranian Voivodeship, Poland; 54.347°N 18.736°E

Refinery details
- Operator: Polski Koncern Naftowy Orlen SA
- Owners: Orlen (70%) and Saudi Arabian Oil Company (30%)
- Opened: 1975
- Area: 220 ha (540 acres)
- Capacity: 210,000 barrels per day (33,000 m^{3}/d)
- Complexity index: 11.1
- Refining units: see text

Gdańsk oil refinery is a 10.5 million tonne per year (210,000 barrels per day, bpd) refinery located near the Polish city of Gdańsk on the Baltic Sea. The refinery was established in 1975 to supply fuels and lubricants, and has undergone several upgrades and expansions to increase its capacity and the range of products available. It now has a Nelson complexity index of 11.1. It is one of two oil refineries in Poland, the other is Plock refinery.

== History ==
The Gdańsk oil refinery was originally designed as a 3 million tonne per year (70,000 barrels per day) crude oil refinery occupying a 220 ha site at Płonia Mała, east of Gdańsk. The refinery included a marine terminal for the import and export of crude oil and petroleum products. The crude oil marine terminal had six storage tanks with a total capacity of 375,000 m^{3..} The Gdańsk Depot had 18 tanks with a capacity of 900,000m^{3}. The refinery was commissioned in 1975 to supply fuels and lubricants for the Polish economy as an alternative to the import of expensive petroleum products from the West.

Design work on the refinery started in 1972. The front-end engineering design was by the Italian design and engineering company Snamprogetti which also procured the plant and equipment. The marshy site of the refinery was drained by nearly 80 km of drainage pipes and 1,000 bored wells. About 270,000 cubic metres of silt and peat and were removed from the site, and over 2 million cubic metres of sand and gravel were used to raise the ground level by 1.5 metres. To support the heavy refinery plant and to provide secure foundations about 8,000 piles, up to 24 metres long, were driven into the ground.

The start-up of the boilers and the injection of steam to clean and purge the plant systems, marked the completion of the construction work and the testing of the plant units. In July 1975, the refinery's water treatment plant was commissioned. In November 1975 the oil heating and the distillation process started: crude oil was fed into the Atmospheric Distillation Unit (ADU) for the first time. Commissioning of the Gasoline Stabilisation Plant enabled gasoline to be produced on 12 December, followed by kerosene and diesel oils. This allowed the start-up of Fuel Oil system on 15 December 1975. Initially, the petroleum products were shipped by sea, prior to the commissioning of the railway terminal. The first batches of fuel oil (13,000 tonnes) were loaded into a tanker on 19 December 1975. By the end of 1975, 132 tonnes of Zakum oil, imported from the United Arab Emirates, had been processed.

In 1976, construction work continued on the Fuel Unit and the Catalytic Systems Complex including the Catalytic Reformer Unit (licensed from Amoco). The commercial production of motor gasolines started in 1976. In February the Vacuum Distillation Unit (VDU) was started and the first vacuum distillation products were transferred to storage tanks. The next plant to be commissioned was the Bitumen Oxidation Unit, with the first batch of road bitumen produced on 4 April 1976. Further parts of the Oil Unit subsequently became operational. On 1 July 1976, the enterprise was renamed Gdańskie Zakłady Rafineryjne (Gdańsk Refinery Plant).

== Expansion ==
Over the period 1996 - 1999 the refining capacity of the refinery was increased from 2.8 to 3.5 million tonnes per year and then to 4.5 million tonnes per year. In addition to capacity new units increased the range of products. These units included a 27,300 barrel per day Hydrocracker; Hydrogen Plant; Sulfur Complex; Naphtha Reformer; Naphtha Isomerisation Offsites and Utilities.

In 2006 the refining capacity was increased again from 4.5 to 6.0 million tonnes per year. An expansion and upgrade of the refinery in 2011 further increased capacity to 10.5 million tonnes per year. Plant included a residue upgrading facilities: CDU/VDU; Solvent Deasphalting unit; Mild Hydrocracker; Gasification unit, Rectisol®, CO shift and methanation.

The Efficient Refining (EFRA) project, completed in 2019, entailed a 350,000 tonnes per annum DCU, an 18,000 tonnes per day coker naphtha hydrotreating unit, a 2,280 tonnes per day High Vacuum Distillation Unit (HVDU), and a 24,000 normal cubic metres per hour (Nm^{3}/hr) hydrogen generation unit. The project included a liquefied petroleum gas (LPG) treatment unit and a coke storage and handling facility.

In 2021 a hydrocracked base oil (HBO) project was launched to produce 400,000 tonnes of Group II base oils a year from the refinery from 2025.

== Current operations ==
The refinery's Nelson Complexity Index (NCI) was increased to 11.1 in 2019.

The refinery's owner and operator Grupa Lotos merged with Orlen in 2022. The refinery is owned by Orlen (70%) and Saudi Arabian Oil Company (30%). It is operated by Polski Koncern Naftowy Orlen SA.

The refinery principally uses Russian export blend crude oil (REBCO) as its feedstock. It also uses crude oil from Poland, Lithuania and elsewhere. In the past it has also used crude oil from central America, the Middle East and the North Sea. In 2020 the refinery processed 10.2 million tonnes of crude oil. In 2021, the Gdańsk refinery’s product output was 11 million tonnes. Diesel oil accounted for the largest share of production, with an output of 6 million tonnes.

The refinery's principal refining plant and products are as follows

=== Refining units ===
The refining units include:

- Crude (Atmospheric) Distillation Unit (CDU)
- Vacuum Distillation Unit (VDU)
- Hydro de-sulferizer (licensed ABB Lummus)
- Solvent Deasphalting Unit
- Hydrocracker
- Hydrogen plant
- Asphalt Unit - 150,000 tonnes per year
- Sulfur Complex
- Naphtha Reformer
- Naphtha Isomerisation
- Mild Hydrocracker
- Gasification unit
- Rectisol®
- CO-shift and methanation

=== Refinery products ===
The refinery products include:

- Gasoline
- Diesel (ultra low-sulfur diesel [ULSD])
- Light heating oil
- Jet fuel
- Bunker oils
- Liquefied petroleum gas (LPG)
- Heavy fuel oil (HFO)
- Bitumens
- Base oils
- Petcoke

== See also ==
- Oil refinery
- Petroleum
- List of oil refineries
- B3 oil field
- B8 oil field
- Oil industry in Poland
- Plock refinery
