= Płock refinery =

Oil Refinery situated in Poland

Płock oil refinery
- Interactive map of Płock oil refinery
- Location: Płock, Masovian, Poland; 52.5858°N 19.6839°E

Refinery details
- Operator: Koncern Naftowy Orlen SA
- Owner: Orlen SA
- Opened: 1964
- Area: 710 ha (1,800 acres)
- Capacity: 276,000 barrels per day (43,900 m^{3}/d)
- Complexity index: 9.5

The Płock refinery is a large oil refinery and petrochemical complex located in Płock, Poland. It is owned by PKN Orlen, and is one of the two major crude oil refineries in Poland, the other one is Gdansk refinery. The refinery has a Nelson complexity index of 9.5 and a capacity is 16.3 million tonnes per year or 276,000 barrels per day of crude oil.

== History ==
In the early 1950s the Polish government wished to develop a petrochemicals industry for the country, to reduce reliance on imports. In Poland there were only five small specialist refineries, which together produced less than one million tonnes annually. Authorisation to build the country's first large-scale crude oil refinery was given in 1954. The Oil Refining Industry oversight body began planning a new one million tonne per year facility. During the design phase the plans were upscaled and the final design had an initial capacity of six million tonnes, with an option to increase capacity up to ten million tonnes. In 1958, Płock was selected as the site for the new refinery, it was known as, and developed by, the Mazovia Refinery and Petrochemical Plant. The plant began operations in 1964.

== Expansion ==
Since 1997 a number of new treatment units were added to the refinery. These increased both the quantity and range of products available. Some of the units were:

- 1997 - 54,000 barrels per day Hydrocracker
- 1999 - Residual Hydrocracker and 80,000 barrels per day expansion
- 2003 - Hydrocracker capacity expanded
- 2006 - Diesel oil hydrodesulphurization unit
- 2007 - Hydrogen plant
- 2010 - Hydrotreater
- 2011 - Combined Heat and Power improvements

A visbreaking unit was commissioned in December 2022. With a design capacity of 3,300 tonnes of vacuum residue feedstock a day the unit increased the overall petrol and diesel yields of the refinery. A hydrocracking unit and a diesel hydrotreater unit were also upgraded, the refinery's annual diesel oil output increased by 150,000 tonnes.

== Refining Units ==
The Refining Units at the refinery are as follows.

- Atmospheric Distillation
- Fluidised Catalytic Cracker - a UOP process
- Hydrocracker – a UOP process (54,000 barrels per day)
- Vacuum Residual desulfurisation unit
- Vacuum Residual Hydrocracker - an Axens process
- CCR Reformer (continuous catalyst regeneration) - a UOP process
- Diesel oil hydrodesulphurization unit
- Jet fuel Hydrotreater
- Isomerizer
- Hydrogen Plant
- Alkylation Unit

The tallest flarestack of the refinery is 250 metres (820 ft) tall and the tallest chimney is 220 metres (720 ft) tall.

== Products ==
Products from the refinery and petrochemical plant included:

Refinery:

- automotive and airplane fuels,
- xylene,
- diesel oil,
- oil coke,
- bitumen,
- lubricant oil,
- hard and soft paraffin

Petrochemical plant:

- ethylene oxide,
- ethylene glycol,
- phenol,
- acetone,
- sulfuric acid,
- polyethylene,
- polypropylene and other plastics

== See also ==
- Petroleum
- List of oil refineries
- Oil industry in Poland
- Gdansk refinery
