= Radlin gas field =

Gas field in Poland

Radlin
- Country: Poland
- Region: Silesian Voivodeship
- Location: Radlin
- Offshore/onshore: onshore
- Operator: PGNiG

Field history
- Discovery: 1980
- Start of development: 1980
- Start of production: 1982

Production
- Estimated gas in place: 11×10^{9} m^{3} 390×10^{9} cu ft

The Radlin gas field in Poland was discovered in 1980. It began production in 1982 and produces natural gas. The total proven reserves of the Radlin gas field are around 390 billion cubic feet (11 billion m³).
