= List of oil and gas fields of the Baltic Sea =

Over 700 wells have been drilled in the Baltic Sea and about 40 significant accumulations of crude oil and natural gas have been discovered. This is an incomplete listing of some of these offshore fields.

Oil and gas fields of the Baltic Sea
Field name	Country	Type	Discovered	Reserves	Infrastructure	Co-ordinates	Start up	Status
Schwedeneck-See oil field	Germany	Oil + gas	1978	2.5 million tonnes	Two concrete gravity platforms A & B	54°35'10"N 10°05'34"E 54°33'41"N 09°58'48"E	1984	Demolished 2003
B3 oil field	Poland	Oil + gas	1981	11 million barrels oil 168 million m^{3} gas	Converted jack-up, oil by tanker, gas pipeline	55°28''N 18°10'E	1992	Production
B4	Poland	Gas	1981	1,972 million m^{3}			2025-27	Design
B6	Poland	Gas	1981	1,793 million m^{3}			2025	Design
B8 oil field	Poland	Oil + gas	1983	3.5 million tonnes oil 432 million m^{3} gas	Converted jack-up, oil to B3, gas to CHP plant	55°24.0’N 18°43.3’E	2006	Production
B21 gas field	Poland	Gas	2013	261.23 million m^{3}		55.168°N 17.6758°E		
Łeba	Poland							Exploration
Gotlandia	Poland							Exploration
Rozewie	Poland							Exploration
D2	Kaliningrad (Russia)	Oil					2030?	Appraisal
D6 Kravtsovskoye oilfield	Kaliningrad (Russia)	Oil	1983	9.1 million tonnes	Oil pipeline to shore	55°20'N 20°34'E	2004	Production
D29	Kaliningrad (Russia)	Oil	2015	2.126 million tonnes			2030?	Appraisal
D33	Kaliningrad (Russia)	Oil	2015	21.2 million tonnes	Fixed platform		2025?	Construction
D41	Kaliningrad (Russia)	Oil	2015	2.003 million tonnes	Drilled from onshore		2019	Production
E6	Latvia	Oil	1984	2-3 million tonnes				
E7	Latvia	Oil						

== Challenges ==
A particular feature of the Baltic Sea that affects the development of offshore oil and gas facilities are the large number of munitions and chemical weapons in some areas of the seabed. It is estimated that 80,000 mines plus other German high explosives were dumped in the Baltic after the war. There are also 300,000 tonnes of chemical weapons including arsenic compounds and mustard gas.

== See also ==
- List of oil and gas fields of the North Sea
