= Kravtsovskoye oilfield =

Oil field in Kaliningrad, Russia

- Country: Russia
- Region: Kaliningrad Oblast
- Location: Baltic Sea
- Block: D-6
- Offshore/onshore: offshore
- Coordinates: 55°17′N 20°36′E
- Operator: Lukoil-Kaliningradmorneft
- Partners: Lukoil

Field history
- Discovery: 1983
- Start of production: 2004

Production
- Estimated oil in place: 9.1 million tonnes (~ 10.6×10^{6} m^{3} or 66.4 million bbl)

The Kravtsovskoye oilfield (Russian: Кравцовское нефтяное месторождение) is located within block D-6 in the coastal waters of the Baltic Sea, about 22 kilometres (14 mi) west of Russia's Kaliningrad Oblast. The deposit was opened in 1983 and extraction began in 2004. The extraction operation is conducted by Lukoil. Recoverable oil in the field is estimated at 9.1 million tonnes. The surrounding waters are about 30 metres (98 ft) deep.

The field is developed with two platforms which were installed by using a Stanislav Yudin crane vessel. The firms involved in the field's infrastructure construction included Corall Central Design Bureau, Kaliningradmorneft, Krein-Shelf, Germanischer Lloyd, Gosgortekhnadzor, Siemens, and HRI Oilfield, L.P. Produced oil and associated gas is transported by a 47-kilometre (29 mi) underwater pipeline to the Romanovo oil-gathering unit. Crude oil is exported through the Izhevsky oil terminal.

Due to its proximity to the Curonian Spit, a UNESCO World Heritage site lying within both Lithuania and the Oblast, concerns over the environmental impact of a spill at the site have been raised. During the 2000s the two states agreed to a joint environmental impact assessment of the D-6 project, including plans for oil spill mitigation. The assessment and mitigation project had not been completed as of 2010.

== See also ==
- Petroleum industry in Russia
- List of oil and gas fields of the Baltic Sea
