= B8 oil field =

Polish oil field in the Baltic Sea

- Location within Baltic Sea
- Country: Poland
- Region: Baltic Sea
- Offshore/onshore: Offshore
- Coordinates: 55°24.0′N 18°43.3′E
- Operator: LOTOS Petrobaltic (LPB)
- Owner: LOTOS Petrobaltic (LPB)

Field history
- Discovery: 1983
- Start of development: 2006
- Start of production: 2006

Production
- Current production of oil: 250,000 t/a (5,000 bbl/d or 790 m^{3}/d)
- Recoverable oil (million tonnes): 3,250,000
- Estimated gas in place: 432,000×10^{9} m^{3} (15,300×10^{12} cu ft)
- Producing formations: Sandstone

B8 is a major oil field in the Polish exclusive economic area of the Baltic Sea about 70 km north of Jastarnia. The field was discovered in 1983 and started producing oil in 2006. The field currently accounts for four per cent of Poland’s oil production.

== The field ==
The B8 oil field is one of only two producing offshore oil fields in Poland, the other is B3. There are further offshore gas fields, such as B4 and B6, although none are in production, The B8 field characteristics are summarised in the table.

Field	B8
Prospect	Łeba
Reservoir	Sandstone
Geological age	Middle Cambrian
Reservoir depth	1,400 metres
Oil character	Light, sweet
Offshore Block	B8
Field delineation	148 km^{2}
Reserves, oil	3.5 million tonnes
Reserves, gas	432 million m^{3}
Discovered	1983
Water depth at installation	84 metres

== Owner and operator ==
The field is owned and operated by LOTOS Petrobaltic (LPB). The production license is valid until 2031.

== Early operations ==
In 2006 Petrobaltic began trial production of the B8 field. Tests indicated that recoverable reserves amounted to 1 million cubic metres of crude oil and more than 100 million cubic metres of natural gas. Production started in 2007 with oil transported to Gdansk refinery and gas flared. In 2010 plans were made to increase production to 1.2 million tonnes per year by 2015, by developing the field. The crude oil and liquid gas production rates over this period are shown in the table.

B8 field production of crude oil and liquid gas 2008-15
Year	2008	2009	2010	2011	2012	2013	2014	2015
Crude oil production, thousand tonnes	90.5	18.3	31.0	3.6	35.1	0.0	0.1	30.5
Liquid gas production, million m^{3}	11.0	2.3	3.8	0.4	4.1	0.0	0.0	3.6

== Infrastructure ==
The Petrobaltic platform was converted in the Remontowa Ship Repair yard. The platform comprises an accommodation module; an oil separation system; a gas compression and export module; a water injection plant; and an energy plant comprising a turbo-alternator using off-gas from the separation to power a gas turbine. The completed platform was towed out and positioned in the field in September 2019. The LOTOS Petrobaltic drilling rig, formerly owned by Transocean and constructed in 1989, drilled six production wells and four water injection plus one remote water injection well.

Produced oil is transferred through a 35 km seabed pipeline to the floating installation on the B3 field. Oil is moved by tanker and is refined at the Lotos Gdansk oil refinery. Gas surplus to the installations fuel requirements is dried and compressed to 10-15 MPa (dense phase gas = 394 kg/m3) and transferred by a 75 km 115 mm diameter pipeline (Maximum allowable operating pressure = 342 barg) to the Combined Heat and Power (CHP) plant at Władysłwowo.

== Production ==
The field is expected to produce about 250,000 tonnes of crude oil per year. This equates to around 5,000 barrels of oil per day. The actual B8 field production data are shown in the table.

B8 field production (barrels of oil equivalent / day) 2019-22
Quarter and Year	Q3 2019	Q3 2020	Q1 2021	Q3 2021	Q1 2022
Production, boe/d	2,809	3,579	3,521	3,175	3,445
Change year on year		+27%	-7%	-11%	-2%
Change quarter on quarter		-6%	+1%	-7%	+2%

The year-on-year increase during Q3 2020 is attributable to the commissioning of the Central Production Facility. The Central Production Facility was commissioned during Q3 2020. This included a 30-day test of the oil separation and export plant. The gas turbine and water injection facility were also tested. During Q1 2021 the gas pipeline was chemically cleaned, the gas system tightness was checked and a test run of the gas drying plant was undertaken. On 30 September 2021 the gas compression and transmission system and the gas export pipeline were brought on stream.

The B8 field's economic limit is about 2056.

== Future development ==
The B8 reservoir has been identified as being potentially suitable for injection of carbon dioxide, captured from a large CO_{2} emitter, to achieve enhanced oil recovery of crude oil from the reservoir.

== See also ==
- B3 oil field
- List of oil and gas fields of the Baltic Sea
- Oil industry in Poland
