= Lubiatów-Międzychód-Grotów oil field =

Oil field in Poland

- Country: Poland
- Region: Lubusz Voivodeship
- Location: Lubiatów
- Offshore/onshore: Onshore
- Operator: PGNiG

Field history
- Discovery: 1993
- Start of production: 1994

Production
- Estimated oil in place: 5.2 million tonnes (~ 6.0×10^{6} m^{3} or 38 million bbl)
- Estimated gas in place: 4.5×10^{9} m^{3} 160×10^{9} cu ft

Lubiatów-Międzychód-Grotów oil field is a Polish oil field that was discovered in 1993. It is one of the biggest on-shore oil field of Poland. It began production in 1994 and produces oil. Its oil proven reserves are about 38 million barrels (6.0×10^{6} m^{3}) and natural gas proven reserves are around 160 billion cubic feet (4.5 billion m³).
