= Kościan gas field =

Gas field in Poland

Kościan
- Country: Poland
- Region: Greater Poland Voivodeship
- Offshore/onshore: onshore
- Coordinates: 52.0440, 16.8650 (approximate)
- Operator: Orlen

Field history
- Discovery: 1999
- Start of development: 1999
- Start of production: 2000

Production
- Estimated gas in place: 10.5×10^{9} m^{3} 371×10^{9} cu ft

The Kościan gas field is a natural gas-condensate field located in Poland.The field was discovered in 1999 and began production in 2000. It is currently owned and operated by the Polish multinational oil refiner and petrol retailer, Orlen S.A. Until 2022, the operator was formerly known as Polskie Gornictwo Naftowe i Gazownictwo SA (PGNiG), which became part of the ORLEN Group after its acquisition. The total proven reserves of the Kościan gas field are around 371 billion cubic feet (10.5 billion m³). The geostrategic influence of the field is minimal, with reserves contributing to 5% of Poland's daily output. The approximate coordinates of the field are 52.0440, 16.8650.

== Discovery ==
The Kościan gas field was found during the drilling of the Zechstein Limestone, a unit of rock layers, in the central areas of the Wolsztyn Uplift. Drilling began in 1996 and led to the discovery of the field three years later in 1999, succeeding the discoveries of other wells such as Bonikowo-1 and Wielichowo-1.

== Reserves ==
Statistics from GlobalData show that 75.85% of the field's total recoverable reserves (proven reserves) have been recovered, during which production peaked in 2003. It is assumed that production will continue until the limit is reached in 2067.

Gas produced in this field is delivered to the Kościan-Brońsko facility, which collects gas from 31 other production wells.
