= Jodłówka gas field =

Gas field in Poland

Jodłówka
- Country: Poland
- Region: Subcarpathian Voivodeship
- Offshore/onshore: onshore
- Operator: PGNiG

Field history
- Discovery: 1980
- Start of development: 1980
- Start of production: 1985

Production
- Estimated gas in place: 3×10^{9} m^{3} 106×10^{9} cu ft

The Jodłówka gas field in Poland was discovered in 1980. It began production in 1985 and produces natural gas. The total proven reserves of the Jodłówka gas field are around 106 billion cubic feet (3 billion m³).
