= Schwedeneck-See oil field =

German oil field in the Baltic Sea

- Country: Germany
- Region: Baltic Sea
- Location: Bay of Kiel
- Offshore/onshore: Offshore
- Operator: Deutsche Texaco; RWE-DEA
- Service contractors: C.G. Doris and IMS

Field history
- Discovery: July 1978
- Start of production: November 1984
- Abandonment: 2000

Production
- Current production of oil: 8,000 barrels per day (~4.1×10^{5} t/a)
- Recoverable oil: 18.5 million barrels (~2.62×10^{6} t)
- Producing formations: Jurassic sandstone

The Schwedeneck-See oil field was a significant oil field in the German sector of the Baltic Sea. It was the first oil field in the Baltic, and was Germany’s first offshore oil field. lt produced oil from 1984 until 2000.

== The field ==
The Schredeneck-See field is located in Kiel Bay in the Baltic Sea about 5 km east from the coast. The reservoir is a Jurassic sandstone at a depth of about 1,511 metres, with a thickness of 8.2 m. The properties of the reservoir and its fluids are:

Schredeneck-See oil field
Property	Value
Reservoir pressure	130 bar
Reservoir temperature	55°C
Permeability	400-2000 md
Specific gravity	0.875 kg/l
Gas Oil Ratio	51 scf/stbbl
Paraffin content	9 %
Viscosity	13 mPas
Pour point	16°C
API gravity	27.6°
Porosity	26 %
Water saturation	25 %
Sulfur content	1.3 %

The field was discovered in July 1978 and had recoverable reserves of 2.5 million tonnes or 18.5 million barrels of oil.

== Development ==
The field was developed by a 50/50% joint venture with Deutsche Texaco AG and Wintershall AG. The project was estimated to cost in excess of DM 300 million (1983 prices). It was developed using two offshore installations and a shore base. There were plans to construct one or two further offshore installations to further develop the field but these were not constructed. The operator opted to build two, single column, concrete gravity base structures to withstand seasonal ice floes in the Baltic.

The platforms were designed by C. G. Doris and IMS of Hamburg. The gravity base comprises a central shaft 13 m in diameter surrounded by 8 shafts of the same diameter and a height of 12.85 m to protect the central column and for water ballasting. The base area was 38 by 38 m.The height of the column was 36.95 m and supported the lower deck of the topsides at this level.

Schredeneck-See oil platforms
Installation	Coordinates	Water depth	Weight	Type	Legs	Well slots	Producing wells	Installed	Production start	Production to
Platform A	R 35 70 716 H 60 51 270	25 m	16,500 tonnes	Concrete gravity base	1	12	7	August October 1983	November 1984	Waabs shore terminal by 5.5 km 10-inch pipeline
Platform B	R 35 63 475 H 60 48 407	16 m	13,200 tonnes	Concrete gravity base	1	12	9	August October 1983	Summer 1985	Waabs shore terminal by 3.5 km 10-inch pipeline

Crude oil was processed through a closed system with processing onshore at Waabs, oil was then sent to the Texaco refinery at Heide. Associated gas produced at Waabs was used for space heating at the terminal and at the nearby Damp 2000 recreation centre. Because of the low gas-oil-ratio there was no flaring of gas on the platforms. Electrical submersible pumps were installed within the wells at a depth of about 1,200 m. The installations were operated remotely from the shore station. When initially commissioned the field produced 1,100 tonnes/d or 8,000 barrels/day of crude oil.

== Decommissioning ==
The RWE-DEA corporation closed the installations in 2000. The topsides were removed and the gravity bases refloated and removed for disposal in 2002.

== See also ==
- Mittelplate
- List of oil and gas fields of the Baltic Sea
