= Dzików gas field =

Gas field in Poland

Dzików
- Country: Poland
- Region: Subcarpathian Voivodeship
- Offshore/onshore: onshore
- Operator: PGNiG

Field history
- Discovery: 1962
- Start of development: 1962
- Start of production: 1965

Production
- Estimated gas in place: 2×10^{9} m^{3} 70×10^{9} cu ft

The Dzików gas field in Poland was discovered in 1962. It began production in 1965 and produces natural gas. The total proven reserves of the Dzików gas field are around 70 billion cubic feet (2 billion m³).
