= B3 oil field =

Oil and gas field in the Baltic Sea

- Country: Poland
- Region: Baltic Sea
- Location/blocks: B
- Offshore/onshore: Offshore
- Coordinates: 55.3600 N, 18.0300 E
- Operator: Orlen
- Owner: Orlen

Field history
- Discovery: 1981
- Start of production: 1992
- Peak of production: 2003

Production
- Current production of oil: 1,151 barrels per day (~72,470 t/a)
- Current production of gas: 18,085×10^{6} m^{3}/d (638.7×10^{9} cu ft/d)
- Recoverable oil: 11 million barrels (~1.9×10^{6} t)
- Estimated gas in place: 168×10^{9} m^{3} (5.9×10^{12} cu ft)
- Producing formations: Sandstone, Middle Cambrian

55°36′00″N 18°03′00″E

B3 is a major oil and gas field in the Baltic Sea. The field is located 80 km north of the Polish coastal town Rozewie. The crude oil is also referred to as Rozewie crude. Processing, drilling and accommodation is based on the jack up rig Baltic Beta located in the field. Most of the oil is shipped by tanker to the Gdańsk refinery as a part of the refinery feedstock. The associated gas is transmitted by pipeline to the combined heat and power (CHP) plant in Wladyslawowo.

== History ==
Exploration of the Baltic Sea for oil and gas was undertaken over the period 1975 to 1990. The B3 field was discovered in the offshore Polish Exclusive Economic Zone in 1981. This exploratory work was carried out by Petrobaltic a Polish state-owned enterprise, but with shareholders in Russia and East Germany. With the collapse of the Soviet Union Petrobaltic re-launched itself as a Polish state-owned organization. Its priorities shifted from exploratory drilling to appraisal with a view to producing commercial quantities of oil and gas. Two appraisal wells were drilled in the B3 field and an extended well test in Spring 1992 proved the viability of the field. The first 30,000 barrels of crude oil was sent to the Gdansk refinery in June 1992.

Petrobaltic eventually became LOTOS Petrobaltic. In 2022 LOTOS merged with Orlen, under which name the field is now operated.

== The field ==
The B3 field properties are summarised in the table.

B3 field reservoir
Parameter	Value
Field	B3
Reservour	Sandstone
Geological age	Middle Cambian
Depth, m	966-1450
Thickness, m	50
°API gravity	42 to 43
Sulfur, wt %	0.12
Character	Light, sweet
Gas oil ratio	85 m^{3} per m^{3}
Water depth at site, m	85

== Production ==
Having established the viability of the B3 field through the appraisal wells, commercial operations began in 1992. The jack up rig Baltic Beta was located on the field to undertake the processing of well fluids and provide the accommodation. This rig was formerly the West Beta owned by Smedvig. Most of the oil produced from B3 is shipped by tanker to Gdansk and fed to the Gdańsk refinery as part of the refinery feedstock. The associated gas is sent through a pipeline to the CHP generating plant in Wladyslawowo.

Further subsea wells were drilled to produce oil and gas from remote parts of the reservoir. Water injection was deployed to further evacuate the relatively low-pressure reservoir. By 2000 there were 12 production wells and five water injection wells. These were drilled through four subsea templates. The injection water plant has a design capacity of 35,000 barrels per day. This was sufficient to maintain production of 10,000 barrels per day. The reservoir has a low gas to oil ratio of 85 m^{3}gas/m^{3} of oil. About 10% of the gas was used as fuel and purge gas on the installation. The remainder was flared. In 2001 compression facilities were added to Baltic Bravo and a 75 km 115 mm diameter pipeline to transfer gas to the CHP plant at Władysłwowo.

The oil and gas resources in the Polish Exclusive Economic Zone of the Baltic Sea accounted for 19.7% of all Polish oil and gas resources.

Peak production from the field was in 2003.

The B3 field production of crude oil and liquid gas during the period 2008-15 is shown in the following table.

B3 field production of crude oil and liquid gas 2008-15
Year	2008	2009	2010	2011	2012	2013	2014	2015
Crude oil production, thousand tonnes	166.4	157.2	155.5	145.5	152.5	145.6	160.1	131.9
Liquid gas production, million m^{3}	18.3	17.3	16.9	15.7	16.8	16.0	17.8	17.8

The B3 field production 2019-22 is shown in the following table.

B3 field production (barrels of oil equivalent / day) 2019-22
Quarter and Year	Q1 2019	Q2 2019	Q3 2019	Q3 2020	Q2 2021	Q3 2021	Q4 2021	Q1 2022
Production, boe/d	1,686	1,183	1,214	1,873	2,310	2,594	2,298	2,000
Change year on year	–	–	–	+54%	+69%	+20%	+23%	+1%
Change quarter on quarter	–	–	–	-14%	+16%	+12%	-11%	-13%

The production of oil and condensate in 2019 was 0.42 million barrels/year. The amounts of gas produced was 6.6 million m^{3}/year.

== Future development ==
The B3 reservoir has been identified as being potentially suitable for injection of carbon dioxide, captured from a large CO_{2} emitter, to achieve enhanced oil recovery of crude oil from the reservoir.

== See also ==
- Gdansk refinery
- B8 oil field
- Petroleum
- Oil industry in Poland
- List of oil and gas fields of the Baltic Sea
