= Przemyśl gas field =

Gas field in Poland

Przemyśl
- Country: Poland
- Region: Subcarpathian Voivodeship
- Offshore/onshore: onshore
- Operator: PGNiG

Field history
- Discovery: 1958
- Start of development: 1960
- Start of production: 1960

Production
- Estimated gas in place: 21×10^{9} m^{3} 741×10^{9} cu ft

The Przemyśl natural gas field is a Polish gas field that was discovered in 1958. It began production in 1960. The total proven reserves of the Przemyśl gas field are around 741 billion cubic feet (21 billion m³).
