= Dębno oil field =

Oil field in Poland

- Country: Poland
- Region: West Pomeranian Voivodeship
- Location: Dębno
- Offshore/onshore: Onshore
- Operator: PGNiG

Field history
- Discovery: 2004
- Start of production: 2005

Production
- Current production of oil: 8,000 barrels per day (~4.0×10^{5} t/a)
- Current production of gas: 1.1×10^{6} m^{3}/d 38×10^{6} cu ft/d 0.4×10^{9} m^{3}/a (14×10^{9} cu ft/a)
- Estimated oil in place: 4.1 million tonnes (~ 5×10^{6} m^{3} or 30 million bbl)
- Estimated gas in place: 8×10^{9} m^{3} 283×10^{9} cu ft

Dębno oil field is a Polish oil field that was discovered in 2004. It is one of the biggest on-shore oil field of Poland. It began production in 2005 and produces oil. Its oil proven reserves are about 30 million barrels (4.8×10^{6} m^{3}) and natural gas proven reserves are around 283 billion cubic feet (8 billion m³).
