= Jasionka gas field =

Gas field in Poland

Jasionka
- Country: Poland
- Region: Subcarpathian Voivodeship
- Offshore/onshore: onshore
- Operator: PGNiG

Field history
- Discovery: 2001
- Start of development: 2001
- Start of production: 2002

Production
- Estimated gas in place: 2×10^{9} m^{3} 70×10^{9} cu ft

The Jasionka gas field in Poland was discovered onshore in 2001. It began production of natural gas in 2002. The total proven reserves of the Jasionka gas field are around 70 billion cubic feet (2 billion m³).
