= Grupa Lotos =

Polish oil company

Grupa Lotos S.A.

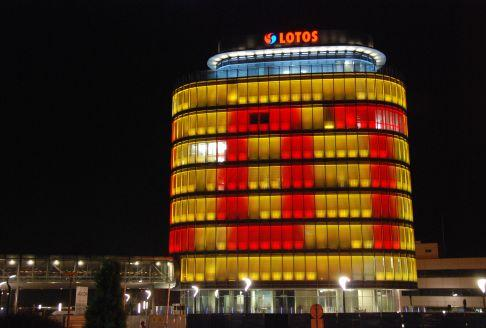
- Lotos headquarters in Gdańsk, Poland
- Company type: Spółka Akcyjna
- Traded as: WSE: LTS
- Industry: Oil and gas
- Founded: 2003
- Defunct: August 1, 2022
- Fate: Merged with Orlen
- Headquarters: Gdańsk, Poland
- Key people: Zofia Paryła (President)
- Products: Petroleum; Petroleum products
- Revenue: PLN 33 billion € 7.252 billion (2021)
- Net income: 369,100,000 euro (2018)
- Total assets: €16.3 billion
- Owner: Orlen
- Number of employees: 7,547
- Website: www.lotos.pl

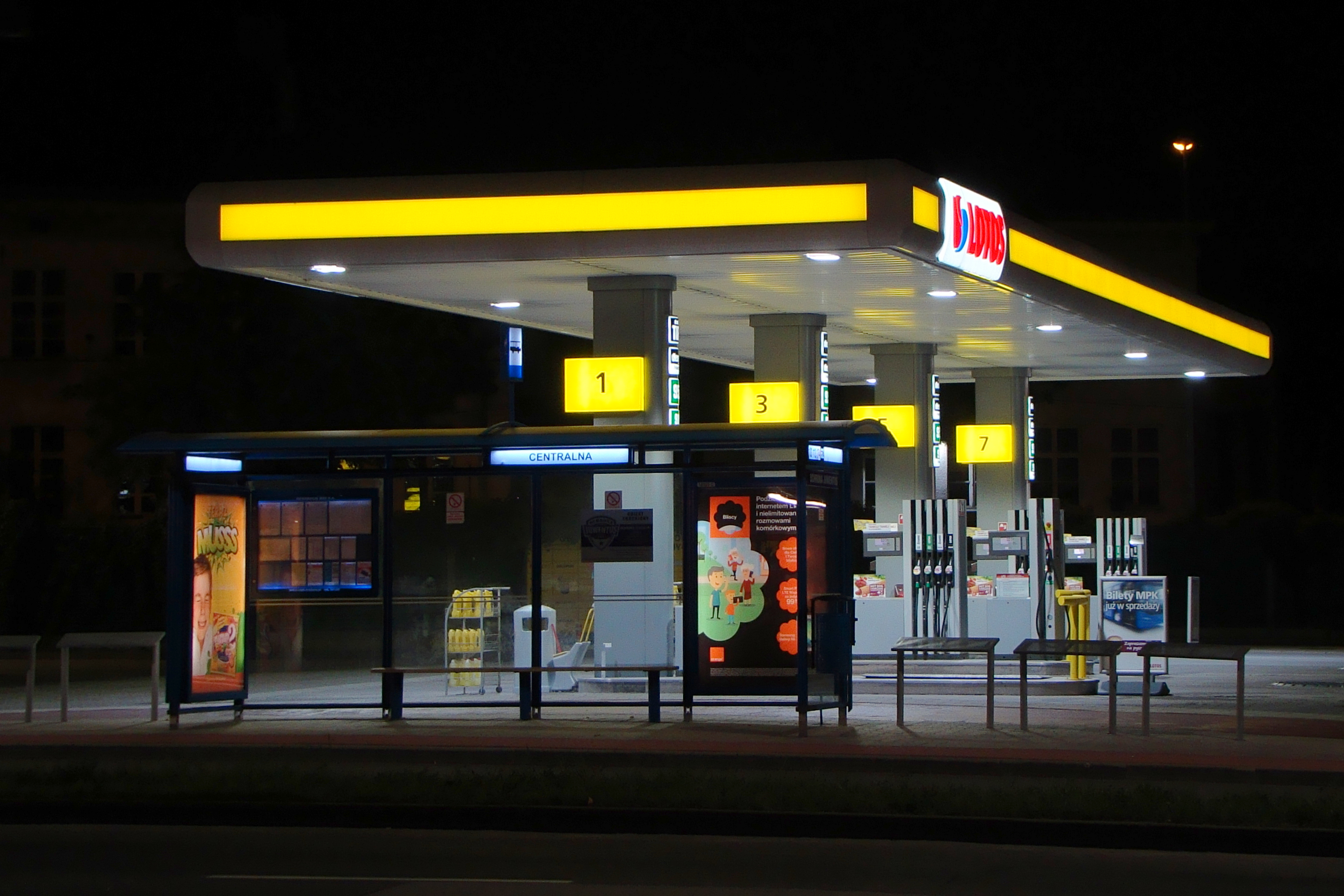
Lotos petrol station in Kraków, southern Poland

Grupa Lotos S.A. was a vertically integrated oil company based in Gdańsk, in northern Poland. The company was listed in the Polish index WIG30. The Polish state was the majority shareholder with 53% percent. The company's main activity branches were: crude oil production, refining and marketing of oil products. The company was a leader in lubricants on the Polish market. Grupa Lotos was a producer of unleaded gasoline, diesel, fuel oils, aviation fuels, motor and industrial lubricants, bitumens and waxes.

In 2018 the Polish oil refiner and retailer PKN Orlen announced its intent to acquire the company. The merger approval from the European Commission required significant asset divestments by both companies and is expected to reach closing in June or July 2022. On August 1, Orlen finalised the merger with Lotos.

== Consolidation ==
Grupa Lotos was a holding composed of Grupa Lotos - the parent undertaking which manages the refinery in Gdańsk - and 18 direct subsidiaries, including Lotos Czechowice (former Rafineria Czechowice), Lotos Jasło (former Rafineria Jasło), crude oil exploration and production company Petrobaltic. At the end of June 2006, Grupa Lotos employed 5547 people, which was 112 employees more than at the end of 2005.

=== Subsidiaries ===
- LOTOS Paliwa
- LOTOS Oil
- LOTOS Asfalt
- LOTOS Gaz w likwidacji
- LOTOS Petrobaltic
- LOTOS Exploration & Production Norge
- LOTOS Infrastruktura
- LOTOS Terminale
- LOTOS Kolej
- LOTOS Lab
- LOTOS Ochrona
- LOTOS Straż
- LOTOS Serwis
- LOTOS Geonafta
- LOTOS-Air BP Polska

== Profits ==
Grupa Lotos holding group consolidated net profit for the first quarter of 2006 financial year, estimated in accordance with IFRS reached approx. PLN 119 million. Grupa Lotos holding group consolidated net profit for whole 2005 financial year, estimated in accordance with IFRS reached approx. PLN 970 million. This is circa PLN 426 million more comparing to financial data from 2004.

== Capacity ==
Gdańsk refinery, owned by Grupa Lotos S.A., refines 6 million tons of crude oil per year. In 2005 Grupa Lotos holding group sold over 5.7 million tons of crude oil based products.

== Future ==
Retail Petrol Stations Network Development Programme, which launched at the end of 2004 assumes expansion of the network stations to 500 outlets. That will allow Grupa Lotos to increase its share in the retail fuel market to approx. 10% in 2012. Purchase of Esso and Slovnaft petrol stations networks in Poland (both networks hold high quality standards and possess sell volume higher than the average petrol station in Poland) indicates concrete acceleration in the process of creation a modern cross-country retail stations network.

In 2020, state-run PKN Orlen plans to take over smaller rival Lotos, if it receives approval from the European Commission. The minister also suggested Poland should have greater control over the economy.

== Development ==
Grupa Lotos strategy aims chiefly at: accomplishment of Gdańsk refinery investment programme (10+ Program), development of crude oil production activity and further shares growth in retail and wholesale petrol market.
