= Lubiatów, Strzelce-Drezdenko County =

Lubiatów
- Village
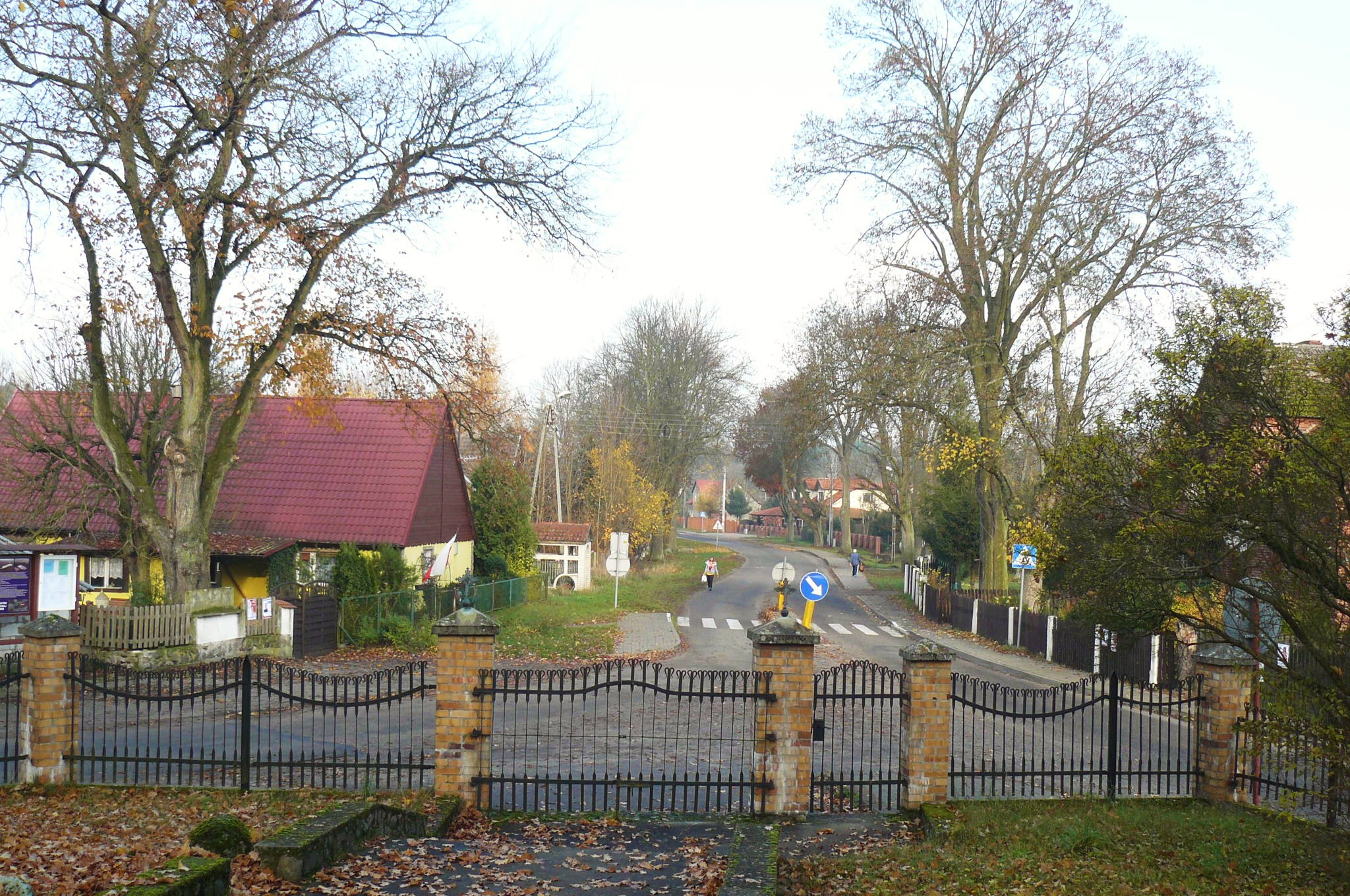

- Location within Poland
- Coordinates: 52°43′1″N 15°47′27″E
- Country: Poland
- Voivodeship: Lubusz
- County: Strzelce-Drezdenko
- Gmina: Drezdenko

Population
  - Total: 160
- Postal code: 66-530

Lubiatów [luˈbjatuf] is a village in the administrative district of Gmina Drezdenko, within Strzelce-Drezdenko County, Lubusz Voivodeship, in western Poland.

The Lubiatów-Międzychód-Grotów oil field lies near the village.
