= Lotos Petrobaltic =

Polish oil company

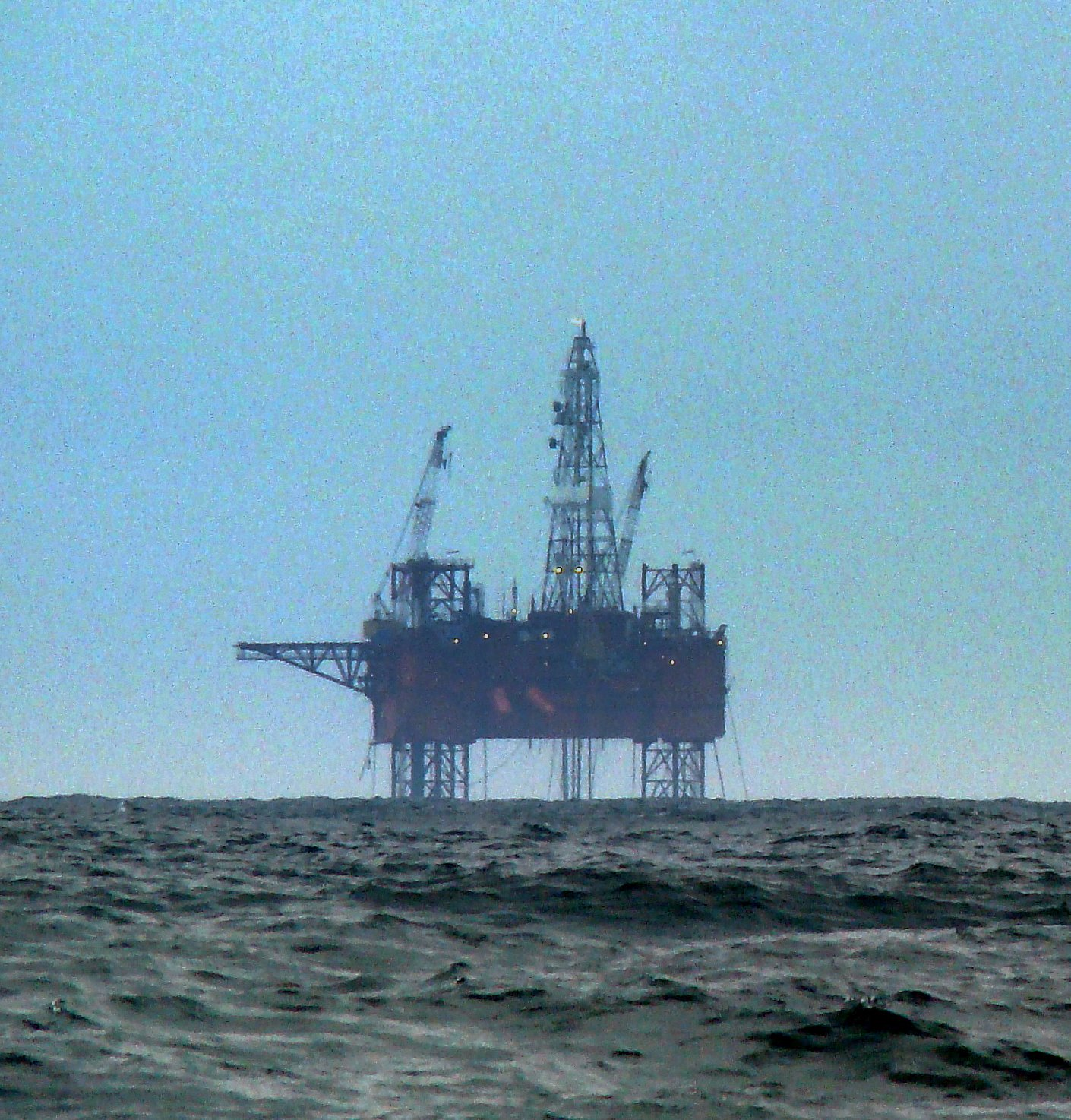
Baltic Beta

Lotos Petrobaltic S.A. is a Polish oil company. It was set up in November 1990. On 1 January 1999, the firm was transformed in limited liability company and the only shareholder become the State Treasury. The company is the only firm in Poland performing exploration and production of crude oil and gas in the Baltic Sea. B3 oil field is currently in production and has a 2006 production of 1.9 million bbl/year.
The company has its head office in Gdańsk. Exploration and exploitation of oil and gas deposits are performed with three drilling platforms: Petrobaltic, Baltic Beta and Jacket.

In 2014 Lotos bought new drilling platform (used one from 1989, made in Singapore, transferred from Transocean Offshore Gulf of Guinea Ltd., operating previously in west Africa) for ~ 300 mln. PLN, with cost paid in equal 1/3 pieces by own money, Nordea Bank credit and Agencja Rozwoju Przemysłu SA (ARP) (credit from government related body, with name meaning Agency for developing industry).
