= Polskie Górnictwo Naftowe i Gazownictwo =

Polish state-controlled oil and gas company

Polskie Górnictwo Naftowe i Gazownictwo SA

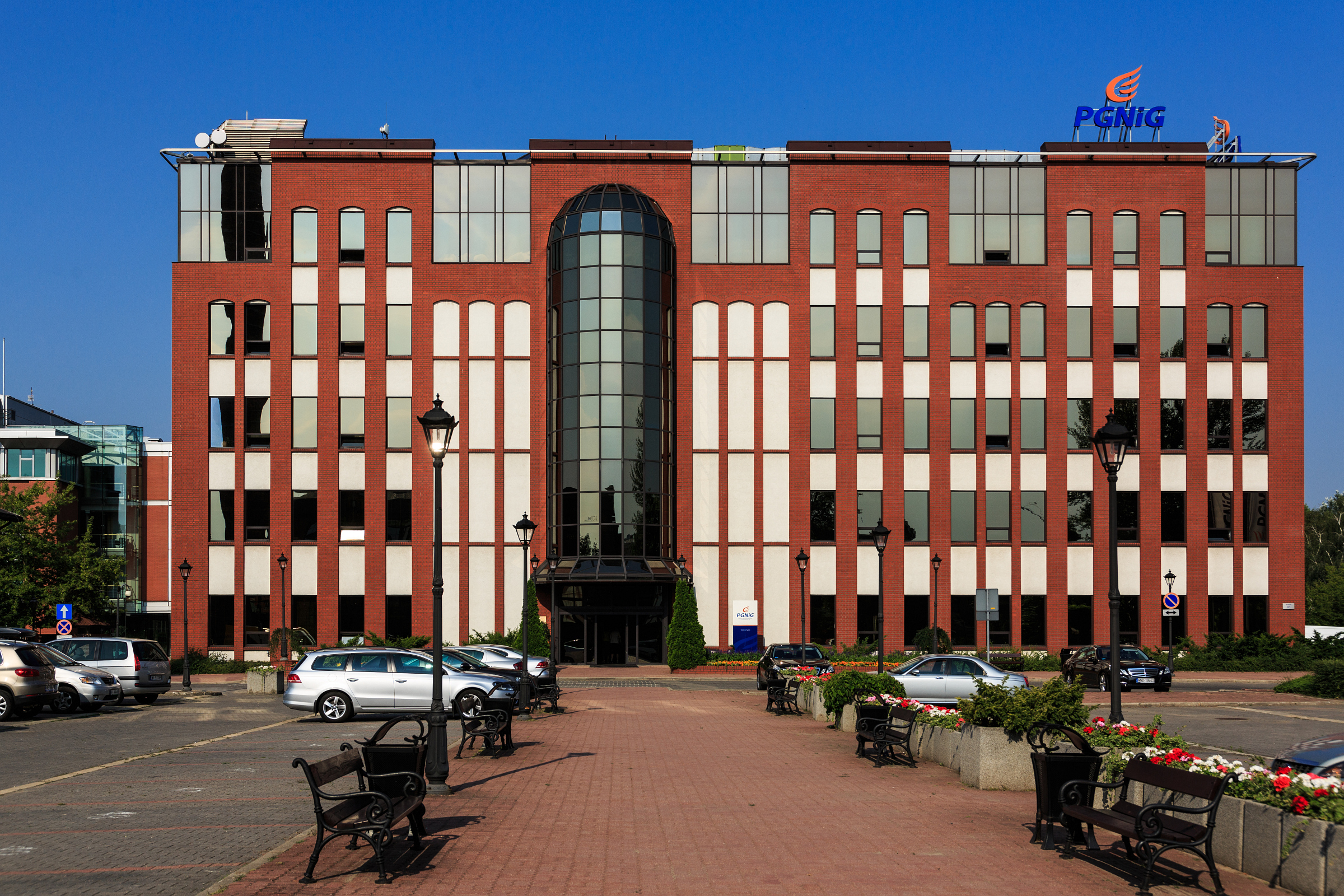
- Company seat in Warsaw
- Type: Spółka Akcyjna
- Traded as: WSE: PGN
- ISIN: PLPGNIG00014
- Industry: Oil and gas
- Founded: 1996
- Defunct: 2023
- Fate: Merged with Orlen
- Successor: Orlen
- Headquarters: Warsaw, Poland
- Products: Natural gas Petroleum
- Revenue: ▲US$ 5.810 billion (June 2019)
- Operating income: ▼US$ 430 million (June 2019)
- Net income: ▼US$ 336 million (June 2019)
- Total assets: ▲US$ 13.807 billion (June 2019)
- Total equity: ▲US$ 9.739 billion (June 2019)
- Number of employees: 24,763 (2018)
- Website: www.pgnig.pl

Polskie Górnictwo Naftowe i Gazownictwo S.A. (en: Polish Oil Mining and Gas Extraction S.A.), abbreviated to PGNiG, was a Polish state-controlled oil and gas company, headquartered in Warsaw, Poland. The company has branches and representative offices in Russia, Pakistan, Belarus and Ukraine and holds equity interests in some 30 subsidiaries, including providers of specialist geophysical, drilling and well service.

PGNiG was one of the largest companies in Poland, the largest Polish oil and gas exploration and production company and was listed on the Warsaw Stock Exchange.

== History ==
=== Foundation and early history (1976–1995) ===
PGNiG was established as a state-owned enterprise on September 1, 1982. The company was a successor of the Union of Oil and Gas Mining, which was created by a merger of the Polish Union of Gas Industry and the Oil Industry Union in 1976.

=== Company development (1996–2012) ===
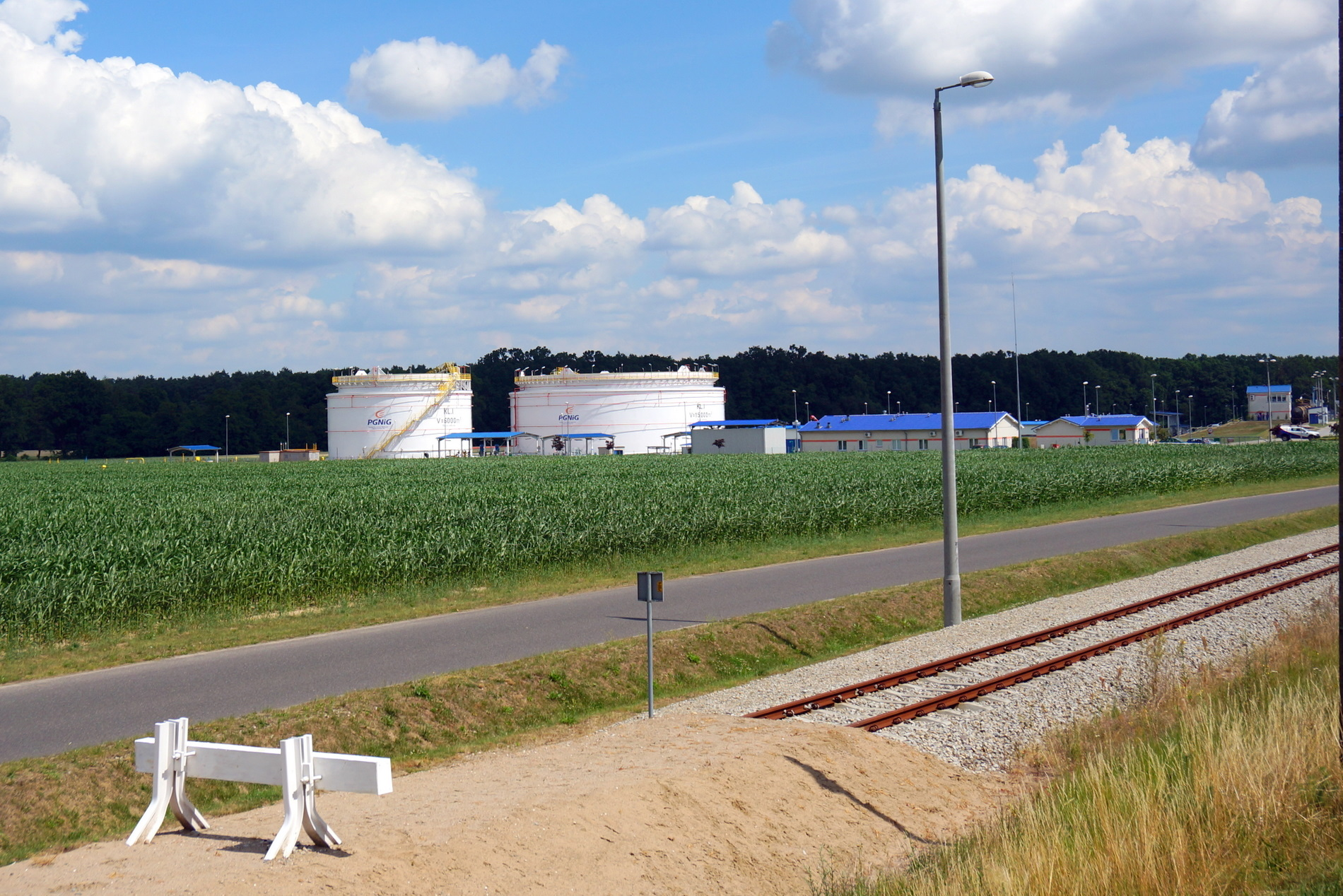
PGNiG Terminal in Wierzbno

In 1996, the company was transformed into a joint-stock company, owned by the state treasury. In 2004, PGNiG Przesyl Sp. z.o.o. (today OGP GAZ-SYSTEM S.A.) was established and became the first step in transforming the company's ownership structure. In 2005, PGNiG was listed on the Warsaw Stock Exchange.

In 2005, PGNiG signed a three-year contract with the government of Pakistan to explore in the Kirthar region, in a joint-venture with Pakistan Petroleum (30%). In the same year the company set up another joint-venture with German Verbundnetz Gas. In 2006, the company first began plans for the Świnoujście LNG terminal (Polskie LNG terminal).

In 2007 and following years, PGNiG and Gazprom had various heated exchanges about pipeline operator EuRoPol Gaz, a Polish-Russian joint venture that operates the Yamal pipeline, after Gazprom had demanded an increase in shareholder rights. In the following year, Polish oil refiner Lotos and PGNiG signed a deal to jointly explore for Norwegian offshore oil.

Following the Russia–Ukraine gas dispute in 2009, Poland and PGNiG began construction of the President Lech Kaczyński LNG Terminal.

In 2011, PGNiG purchased 99.8% of Vattenfall Heat Poland's assets for PLN 2.96bn, becoming the owner of Elektrociepłownia Warszawskie. In the same year, the company started large-scale exploration for possible shale-gas reserves in Poland. The first shale gas was produced from a well in northern Poland within the same year, and commercial production levels were expected to be reached by 2014. In discussions about the impact of shale-gas extraction (fracking), PGNiG officials stated, that regulation should happen on national levels and not be decided by institutions like the EU. In 2012, Poland granted 111 shale-gas exploration licenses.

In 2011, PGNiG was excluded from developing a gas field in Iran.

In 2012, Polish chemical company Tarnow announced to partner with PGNiG in building a 130 megawatts gas-fuelled heat and power plant.

At the end of 2012, one of the main investment projects for the development of natural gas and crude oil fields in the Lubiatów-Międzychód-Grotów region (LMG project) was completed. Test production had started in early August. The newly erected facilities and 14 wells were expected to produce around 100 million cubic metres of natural gas and 300,000 tonnes of crude oil, and together with another Norwegian project, doubled PGNiG's total oil production levels.

Poland and PGNiG had been following plans to reduce dependence on Russian gas for several years. Following the increase of costs for gas imports from Russia in 2012, the company announced a two-year plan to reduce costs and sell non-essential company assets, while also preparing for two subsidiary IPO's in 2013. The company also ended pricing negotiations with Gazprom in November 2012, agreeing to change a pricing-formula from contracts signed in 1996.

=== Recent history (2013–today) ===
In September 2013, the consolidation of all gas companies within the PNGiG consortium into one company, under the name Polska Spółka Gazownictwa, was completed. In December 2013, PGNiG announced a cooperation with Chevron in order to scale-up their shale-gas operations faster.

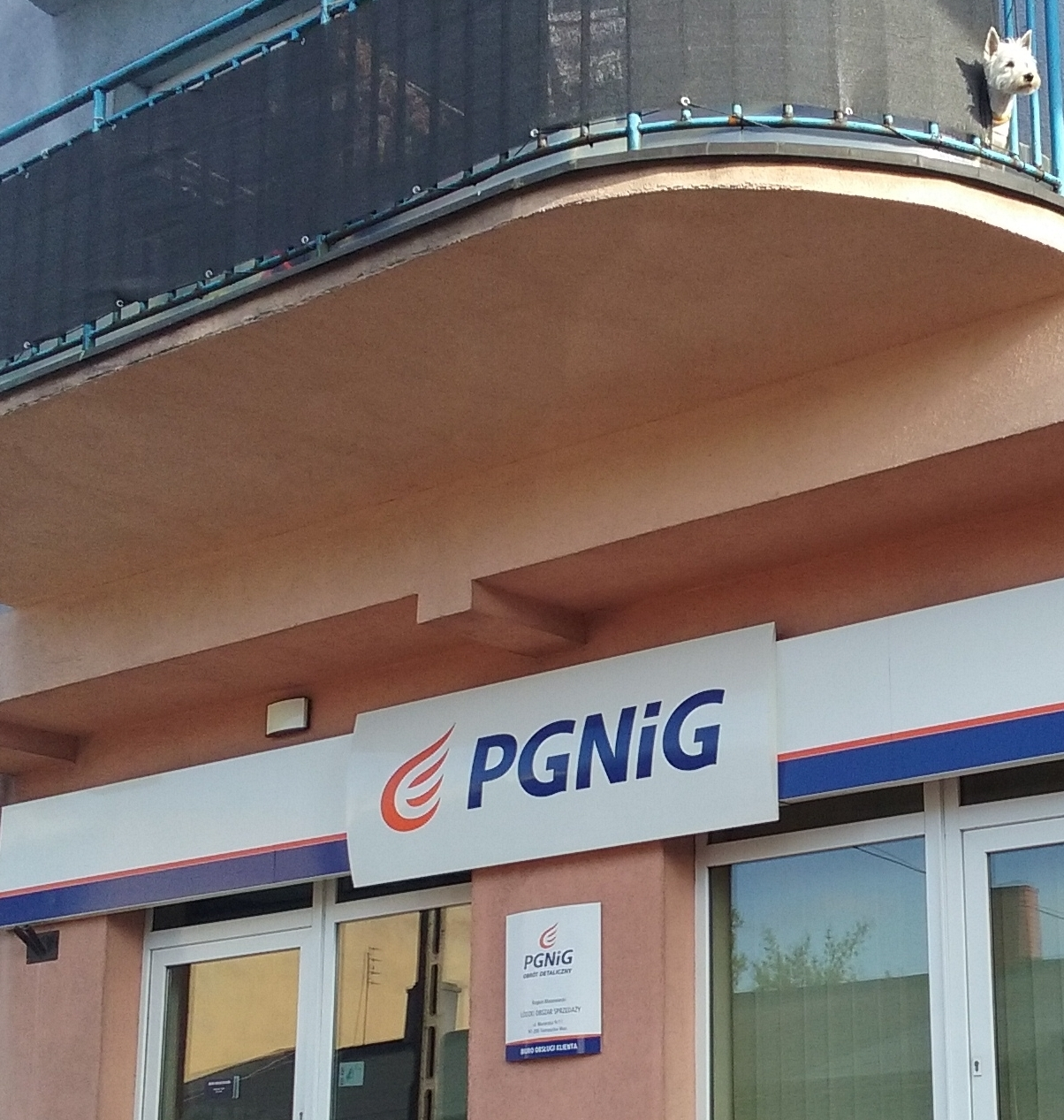
Customer service in Tomaszów Mazowiecki (Łódź Voivodeship)

On August 1, 2014, PGNiG OBRÓT DETALICZNY was separated from the current structure of PGNiG SA. Its establishment was dictated by legal conditions and the need to prepare for the upcoming full liberalisation of the gas market in Poland. As a result of the change, all retail customer service in the field of natural gas and electricity sales were transferred to the new company. Following these steps in deregulation of the Polish energy market, PGNiG was one of the first companies to directly trade on the nation's gas exchange. In 2014, as part of the Russo-Ukrainian War, PGNiG reported a reduction of gas deliveries from Russia by 45%. As part of this reduction, PGNiG had to temporarily cut their gas exports to Ukraine.

In 2015, PGNiG expanded their cooperation with PKN, jointly exploring for oil and gas in the south-east of Poland.

In June 2016, the President Lech Kaczyński LNG Terminal received the first commercial cargo of liquefied natural gas under a commercial contract between PGNiG SA and Qatar's LNG producer QatarEnergy LNG. Another LNG cargo was delivered from Norway's Statoil, totaling around 140,000 tons.

In 2017, Qatargas signed a new LNG Sale and Purchase Agreement (SPA) with PGNiG, agreeing to deliver two million tonnes per annum (MTPA), starting on 1 January 2018 (until June 2034). The company also announced the first LNG delivery from the United States, which became the first LNG cargo shipment from the US Europe. In March of the same year, Polish energy firms PGNiG, PGE and Energa announced a total investment of $127 million into Poland's coal mining firm PGG. More than half of the investment came from PGNiG. The three companies had become PGG investors in the previous year. In 2017, PGNiG first signed a gas storage agreement with Ukraine's Ukrtransgaz, which was extended in 2018. By April 2022, PGNiG had ordered seven LNG carriers.

In June 2018, PGNiG signed an agreement with Port Arthur LNG to supply Poland with LNG from the Port Arthur facility in Jefferson County, Texas, United States.

In November 2018, PGNiG signed a long-term contract with Cheniere Marketing International. It secures liquefied natural gas supplies from the United States of America.

In December 2018, PGNiG won an exploration licence for blocks in the Emirate of Ras Al Khaimah, United Arab Emirates (UAE). For organizational and nonadministrative purposes, the company will establish a local office in the emirate.

In June 2019, PGNiG agreed with its US counterpart Venture Global for an annual increment of 1.5 million metric tons from the Plaquemines terminal. Thus, the volume of liquefied gas from the Plaquemines terminal will increase from 1.5 to 2.5 million tons per year.

In July 2019, PGNiG Upstream Norway, a subsidiary of the PGNiG bought 20% of the Duva field from Wellesley Petroleum.

On 14 July 2020, PKN Orlen announced its intention to take over PGNiG, and on 10 May 2021, it submitted a takeover application to the Office of Competition and Consumer Protection.

In September 2021, PGNiG bought Ineos' oil and gas business in Norway in a $650 million deal. The deal includes all of Ineos' oil and gas business in production, licenses, fields, facilities and pipelines of Ineos on the Norwegian continental shelf.

In 2021, PGNiG was ranked no. 58 in the Arctic Environmental Responsibility Index (AERI) that covers 120 oil, gas, and mining companies involved in resource extraction north of the Arctic Circle.

In September 2022, PGNiG signed a major deal to buy natural gas from Equinor, which was considered one of the major energy companies. Under the agreement, PGNiG will receive 2.4 billion cubic meters of gas per year for 10 years, as the gas will pass through the new Baltic pipeline project. This step comes in an attempt by the government to replace Russian gas and diversify gas supplies in the country.

In October 2022, Shareholders of PGNiG approved the company's takeover by PKN Orlen, this came after PKN Orlen Shareholders done the same.

==== Relation to Russia ====
As part of Polish plan to become fully energy independent from Russia within the next few years, Piotr Wozniak, president of the company, stated in February 2019: "The strategy of the company is just to forget about Eastern suppliers and especially about Gazprom." In 2020, the Arbitration Institute of the Stockholm Chamber of Commerce ruled that PGNiG's long-term contract gas price with Gazprom linked to oil prices should be changed to approximate the Western European gas market price, backdated to 1 November 2014 when PGNiG requested a price review under the contract. Gazprom had to refund about $1.5 billion to PGNiG. The 1996 Yamal pipeline related contract is for up to 10.2 billion cubic metres of gas per year until it expires at the end of 2022, with a minimum annual amount of 8.7 billion cubic metres. Following the 2021 global energy crisis, PGNiG made a further price review request on 28 October 2021. PGNiG stated the recent extraordinary increases in natural gas prices "provides a basis for renegotiating the price terms on which we purchase gas under the Yamal Contract."

In the light of the 2022 Russian invasion of Ukraine, gas supply from Russia became even more difficult. According to PGNiG, the Russian energy firm Gazprom had told it on April 26, 2022, all gas deliveries to Poland would be halted from 08:00 CET the next day. Gazprom stated that the suspension under new rules announced a month before, which mean "unfriendly" countries must pay for gas in rubles. PGNiG has always refused to do this. At this time, PGNiG relied on Gazprom for the majority of its gas imports and bought 53% of its imports from Russia in the first quarter of 2022. In May 2022, Russia issued sanctions against EuRoPol Gaz, Gazprom Germania and other gas companies.

== Corporate affairs ==
=== Structure ===
PGNiG was composed of various subsidiaries. As of 2017 the group included 20 direct and 14 indirect subsidiaries in the production, trade and service industries. The group also features a mutual insurance company,

=== Leadership ===
PGNiG's chief governing body was the management board, which has five members. The board was led by president Piotr Woźniak. In January 2020, PGNiG appointed Jerzy Kwiecinski as new President of the Management Board. The other members are Jarosław Wróbel, vice president of the board, Przemysław Wacławski, vice president finance, Arkadiusz Sekściński, vice president development, Robert Perkowski, vice-president operational and Magdalena Zegarska, vice-president. Violetta Jaśkowiak serves as an authorized executive manager (procurator). The supervisory board has eight members and was led by chairman Bartłomiej Nowak and vice-chairman Piotr Sprzączak.

=== Shareholder ===
As of September 2019, PGNiG's shareholder structure is:

- 71.88% - State Treasury
- 28.12% - Free Float

== Operations ==
PGNiG operates along the whole value-chain of oil and gas, including exploration and development, upstream production, transportation and downstream processing and delivery of the refined products to private and corporate customers. It 2008, the company supplied gas to 6.5 million customers. The largest of them were combined heat and power plants, steel mills and nitrogen plants.

=== Upstream operations ===
The production and extraction of natural gas and crude oil throughout the country was handled by two main branches of the company - in Zielona Góra and in Sanok. The Zielona Góra Branch produces nitrogenous natural gas in 27 mines (17 gas and 10 oil-gas mines), while the high-methane gas was produced by the Sanok Branch and extracted in 47 mines (25 gas and 22 oil-gas mines). The produced nitrogen-rich gas was further processed into high-methane gas at the denitrification plant in Odolanów and at the newly built denitrification plant near Grodzisk Wielkopolski.

PGNiG has international operations in different countries. It has been active in the Middle East and Asia since the 1980s. In October 2018, PGNiG was one of several companies to not extend operations in Iran, following the reinstatement of U.S. sanctions.

=== Downstream operations ===
PGNiG was the only producer of Helium in Central Europe.

=== Exploration and production ===
PGNiG's Exploration and Production segment reported an operating profit of PLN 2,805m for 2017. The company held a total of 213 production licences in Poland, produced 787,000 tonnes of oil and 3,839 mcm of high-methane and nitrogen-rich gas. Outside of Poland, PGNiG reported a total production of 698 mcm in combined gas and 470,000 tonnes of crude oil.

The company was also engaged in exploration activities in Pakistan, and minor activities in Libya and Iran.

=== Trade and storage ===
PGNiG's trade and storage operations are in charge of the company's international natural gas trading business. The company operates seven underground gas storage facilities in Poland, that are located in Brzeźnica, Husów, Mogilno, Strachocina, Swarzów, Wierzchowice and Kosakowo. As of May 2022, Poland has 34 TWh of gas storage, of which 96% is used. Since 2017, PGNiG also operates storage facilities in Ukraine, partnering with the local gas transmission operator Ukrtransgaz.

== Awards and recognitions ==
In 2017, the Parkiet daily and the Institute of Accountancy and Taxes, named PGNiG one of the 28 most transparent companies in Poland.

In 2019, the PGNiG Annual Report received the award for “The Best Annual Report” in the category “Enterprises” from the Institute of Accounting and Taxes (IRiP).

== Environmental concerns ==
Some scientists and local fishermen have raised concerns about the potential effect of LNG infrastructure on marine life in the Baltic Sea.

== See also ==
- List of petroleum companies
