= CPN =

CPN may refer to:

- Calpine Corporation, New York Stock Exchange symbol CPN
- Carnivorous Plant Newsletter
- Carpinteria (Amtrak station), California, Amtrak station code CPN
- Caspian Airlines (Iran), ICAO airline designator CPN
- Central Park North (disambiguation)
- Central Pattana, Stock Exchange of Thailand symbol CPN
- Centrala Produktów Naftowych, a national petrol company in Polish People's Republic
- Citizen Potawatomi Nation, a federally recognized tribe of Potawatomi people located in Oklahoma
- Clapham North tube station, London, London Underground station code CPN
- Confederation of the Polish Nobility
- Community protection notice in the United Kingdom

== Medical, mathematics, science ==
- Lysine carboxypeptidase, an enzyme
- Certified pediatric nurse, nurse who specializes in neonates and children
- Chlamydia pneumoniae, generally Cpn or CpN
- Complex projective space, $\mathbb{C}\mathrm{P}^n$
- Coloured Petri net, in mathematics
- Community psychiatric nurse
- Celiac plexus neurolysis, in medicine, the chemical ablation of the celiac plexus

== Political parties ==
- Communist Party of Nepal
- Communist Party of the Netherlands
- Country and Progressive National Party, early 20th-century political party in Queensland, Australia
