= Orlen =

Polish oil refiner and petrol retailer

Orlen SA

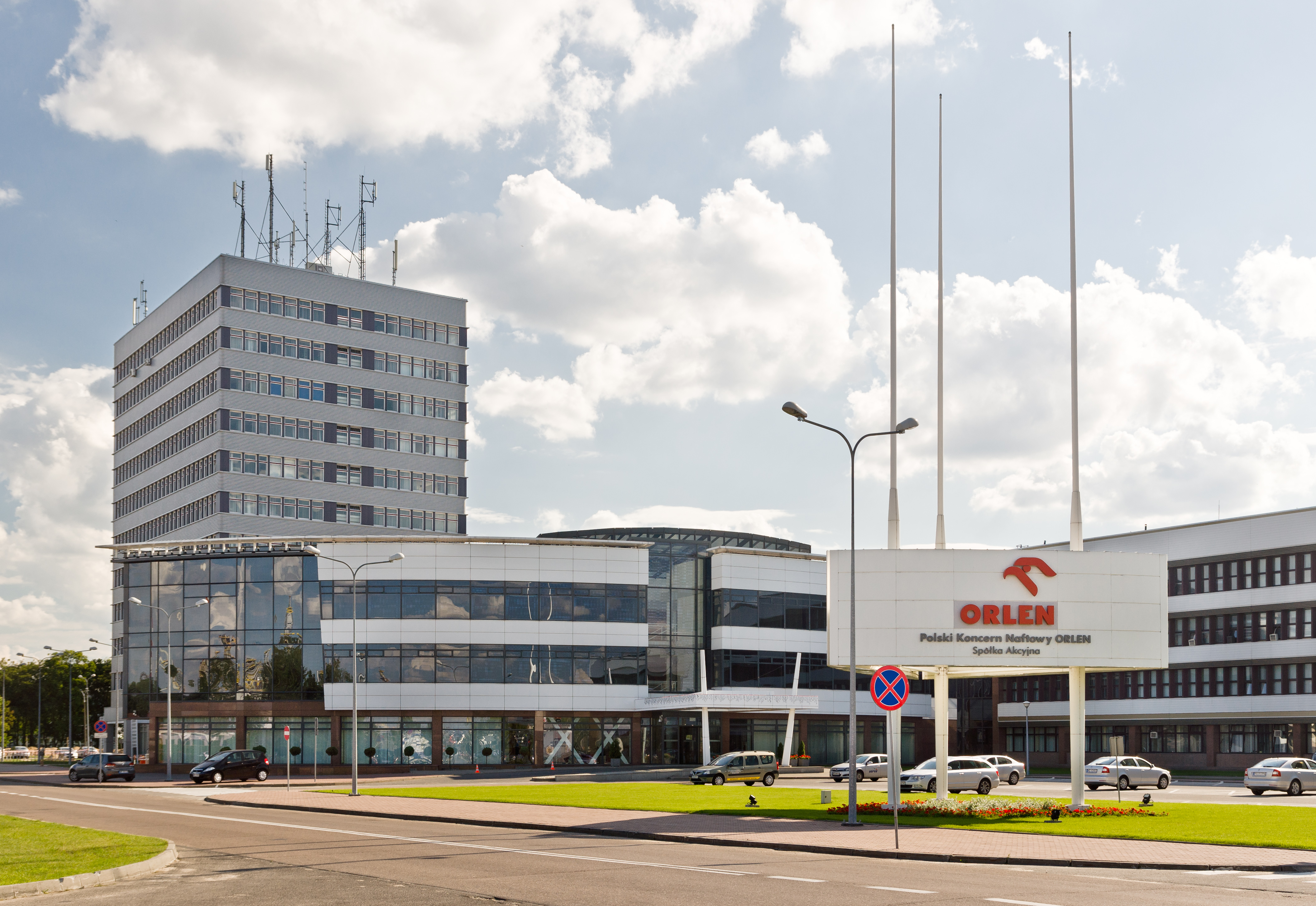
- Orlen's headquarters in Płock, Poland
- Type: Spółka Akcyjna
- Traded as: WSE: PKN; WIG30 component
- ISIN: PLPKN0000018
- Industry: Petroleum
- Predecessor: CPN; Petrochemia Płock
- Founded: Płock, Poland; 7 September 1999 as Polski Koncern Naftowy
- Headquarters: Płock, Poland
- Area served: Austria, Canada, Czech Republic, Germany, Hungary, Latvia, Lithuania, Norway, Pakistan, Poland, Slovakia
- Key people: Ireneusz Fąfara (President of the Management Board); Wojciech Popiołek (Chairman of the supervisory board)
- Products: Fuel, crude oil and other natural gas
- Brands: Orlen, Centrala Produktów Naftowych, Star, Unipetrol, Benzina, Orlen Lietuva, Turmöl
- Revenue: US$74.61 billion (2025)
- Operating income: US$10.5 billion (2025)
- Net income: US$2.8 billion (2025)
- Total assets: US$61.82 billion (2025)
- Owner: Polish state (49.9%); Nationale-Nederlanden (5.2%)
- Number of employees: 67,809 (2025)
- Website: orlen.pl

Orlen SA (formerly PKN Orlen SA (Polish: Polski Koncern Naftowy Orlen Spółka Akcyjna, lit. 'Polish Oil Concern Orlen Public Corporation'), commonly known as Orlen is a Polish multinational oil refiner, petrol retailer and natural gas trader headquartered in Płock, Poland. The company's subsidiaries include the main oil and gas companies of the Czechia and Lithuania, Unipetrol and Orlen Lietuva, respectively.

The corporation is a significant European publicly traded firm with operations in Poland as well as Austria, Canada, Czechia, Germany, Hungary, Latvia, Lithuania, Norway, Pakistan, and Slovakia. As of November 2026, the largest shareholder of the company is the Polish state (via the State Treasury) with 49.9% of the shares, ahead of Nationale-Nederlanden OFE with 5.2% of the shares.

The company is listed on the Warsaw Stock Exchange and, as of 2025, its reported revenue constituted over US$74.61 billion. It employs over 67,809 people, owns more than 3,400 service stations in seven countries and markets its products to over 100 countries worldwide.

Orlen is the largest company in Central and Eastern Europe and is listed in global rankings such as Fortune Global 500, Platts TOP250 and Thomson Reuters TOP100.

== History ==
=== Foundation (1999–2001) ===
PKN Orlen was created in 1999 after the Council of Ministers of Poland in the previous year decided to partially privatise and merge two state-run petrochemical firms: Centrala Produktów Naftowych (CPN), Communist Poland's petroleum retail monopoly, and Petrochemia Płock, the state firm in charge of the oil refineries in Płock, the largest complex of its kind in Poland. After said merger, the company was renamed Polski Koncern Naftowy (PKN), with Orlen added several months later as the consortium's brand name.

==== Etymology and logo ====
Orlen SA brand name is derived from orl- for "orzeł" (Polish: eagle) and its adjective "orli", and -en for "energia" (Polish: energy). The eagle head icon – complete with a bill, eye and crest – is also integrated into the company’s logo.

=== Orlengate scandal (2002) ===
Orlengate is the biggest corruption scandal in the modern political history of Poland. The scandal was unearthed with the arrest on 7 February 2002 by the UOP (Office for State Protection) of Andrzej Modrzejewski, then CEO of PKN Orlen. He was accused of insider trading and disclosure of confidential information.

=== International expansions (2002–2014) ===
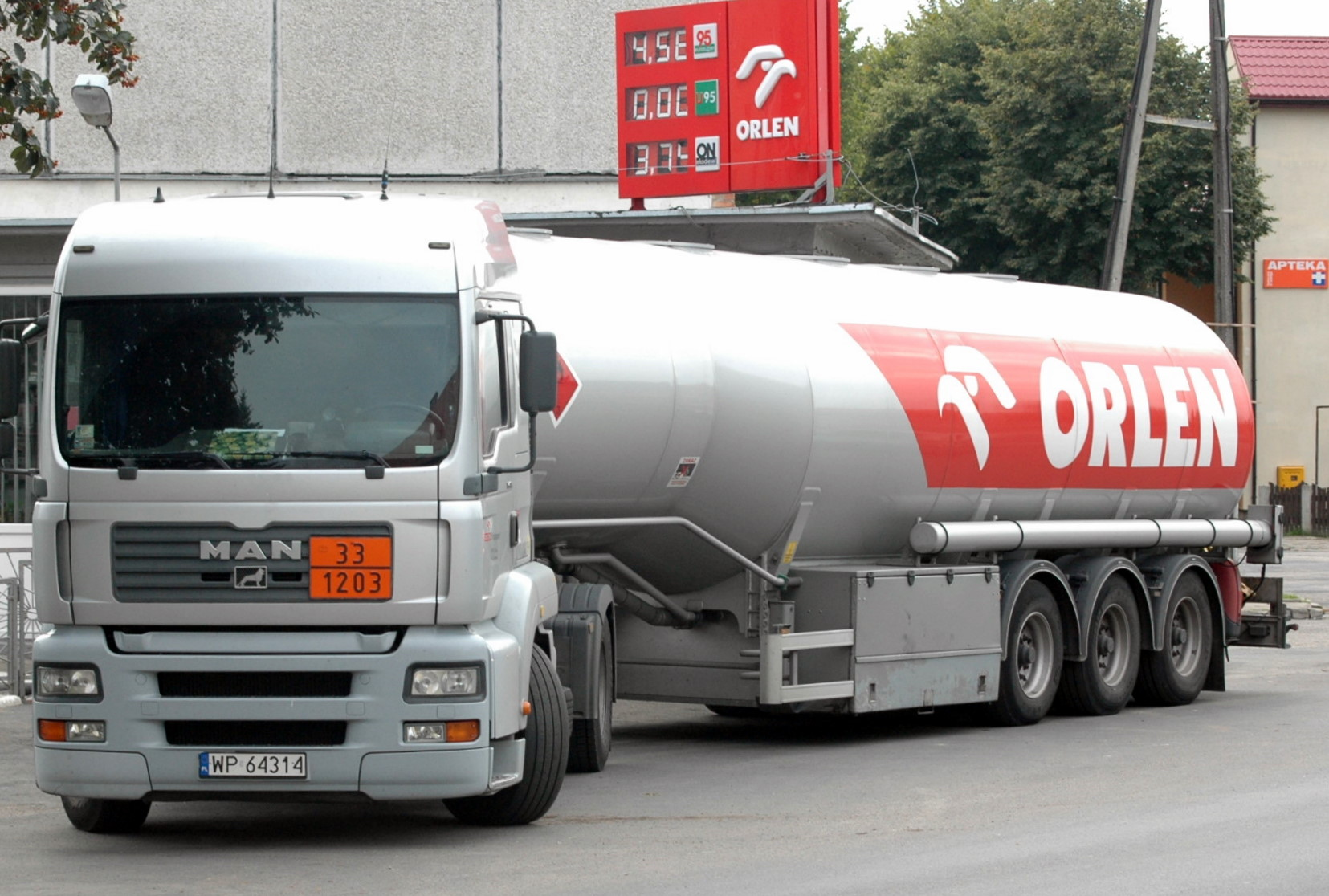
MAN TGA semi-trailer tank truck operated by PKN Orlen in Wolin (September 2009)

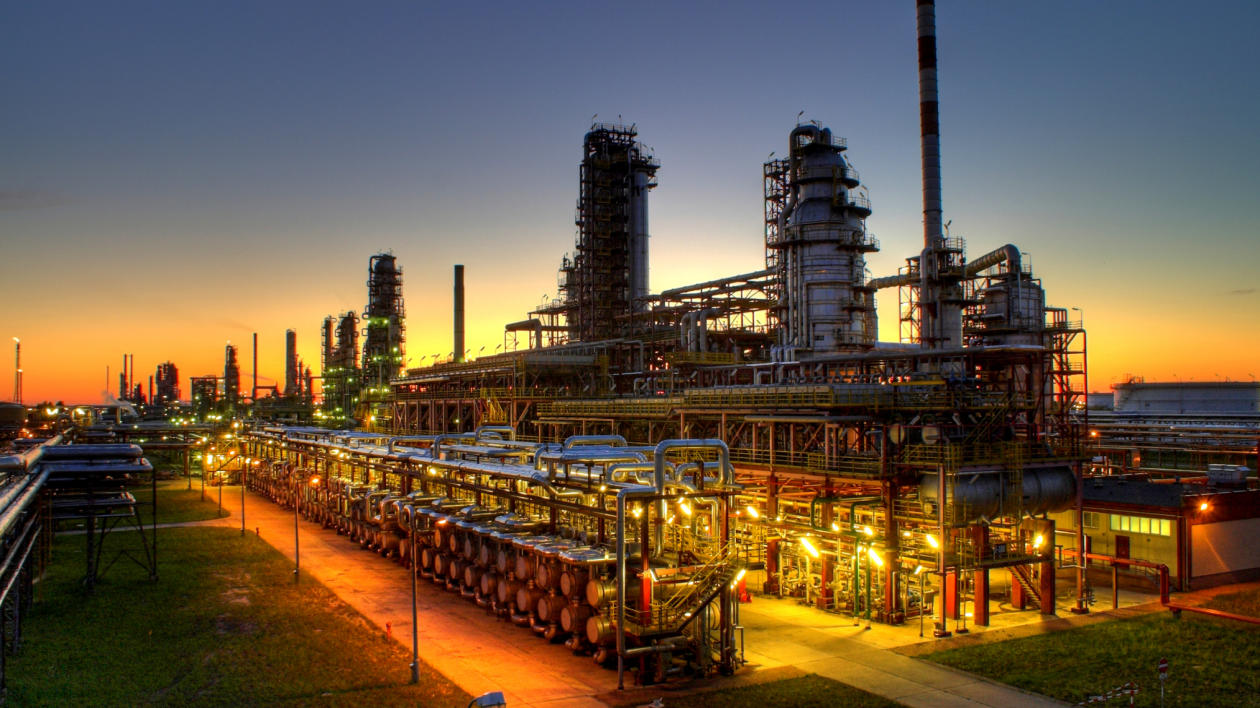
Mažeikiai oil refinery, part of Orlen Lietuva

After losses in 2000 and 2001 the fund returned 25% in 2002. Until July 2003, it grew by nearly one-third since March and in total the fund was up by about 60% since the start of 1994.

==== Enlargement ====
Zbigniew Wróbel directly succeeded as CEO and proposed in December 2002 $160 million for the purchase of 295 German gas stations from the British BP PLC. It was the first step in Wrobel's strategy of expanding west. At this time PKN Orlen was Poland's largest company, with sales of $7.2 billion.

In 2003, PKN Orlen acquired 494 filling stations in Northern Germany from BP under premise of a competition law when BP took over Aral AG for a total of €180 million. As of 2007 Orlen has 581 filling stations in Germany (484 under the Star brand, 58 under the Orlen brand and 29 under a supermarket brand).

In January 2003, PKN Orlen and MOL signed a Memorandum of Understanding whereby they agreed intention to initiate co-operation in the Central and Eastern European oil sector. They hoped that the collaboration would allow them both to benefit from the synergies and to compete more effectively in the global competition. In July 2003, the Croatian INA refinery was sold for $505 million to PKN Orlen's competitor, the Hungarian oil company MOL. This strengthen MOL's position in the battle for control of Central Europeans and Balkan fuel markets.

Furthermore, PKN Orlen was involved in merger talks with the MOL Group in 2005. If merged, the two firms would have created a regional giant, and controlled much of Central Europe's oil industry. However, the planned merger failed due to high politicization. Following the dropped merger plans, PKN Orlen bought a majority stake in Czech Unipetrol. During May 2006, the company announced its largest investment ever when it took over a majority share of 84.3% of the largest company of Lithuania, Mažeikių Nafta. It was partly bought from Yukos (53.7%) and partly from the Lithuanian government (30.6%) in December. Earlier on 12 October a fire damaged the Mažeikių refinery, which caused a loss about $75 million. With the completion of the takeover, PKN Orlen became Central Europe's largest company.

In May 2007, after Lithuania sold its refinery to PKN Orlen, the Russian government approved the construction of a new $2 billion pipeline, that passes Belarus and Lithuania.

In 2007, Unipetrol, which is majority-owned by PKN Orlen, sold 100% of synthetic-rubber producer Kaučuk to Polish chemicals company Chemiczna Dwory for €195 million. The sale was part of a drive by Unipetrol to divest non-core assets and to focus on petrochemical, oil refinery and fuel retailing business.

In 2010, PKN Orlen had a reported revenue of $28.8 billion. Next year it was the largest fuel retailer in Poland with over 2000 locations. The company ran the most advanced and the second largest complex for terephthalic acid production in Europe. PKN Orlen also sponsors the Orlen Arena in Płock since its opening in 2010.

In 2013, PKN Orlen and Klaipedos Nafta oil terminal negotiated the co-operation on a new pipeline supported by the Lithuanian government. In order to establish the company in Canada and to become an oil producer Orlen bought the oil and gas company TriOil Resources Ltd for $169 million in September 2013. After its first foreign expansion the company acquired Birchill Exploration Ltd due to double its production in May 2014.

PKN Orlen, under a joint venture with the Dutch-American firm LyondellBasell, also owns Poland's largest plastics company called Basell Orlen Polyolefins Sp. z o.o.

=== Diversification (2015–present) ===
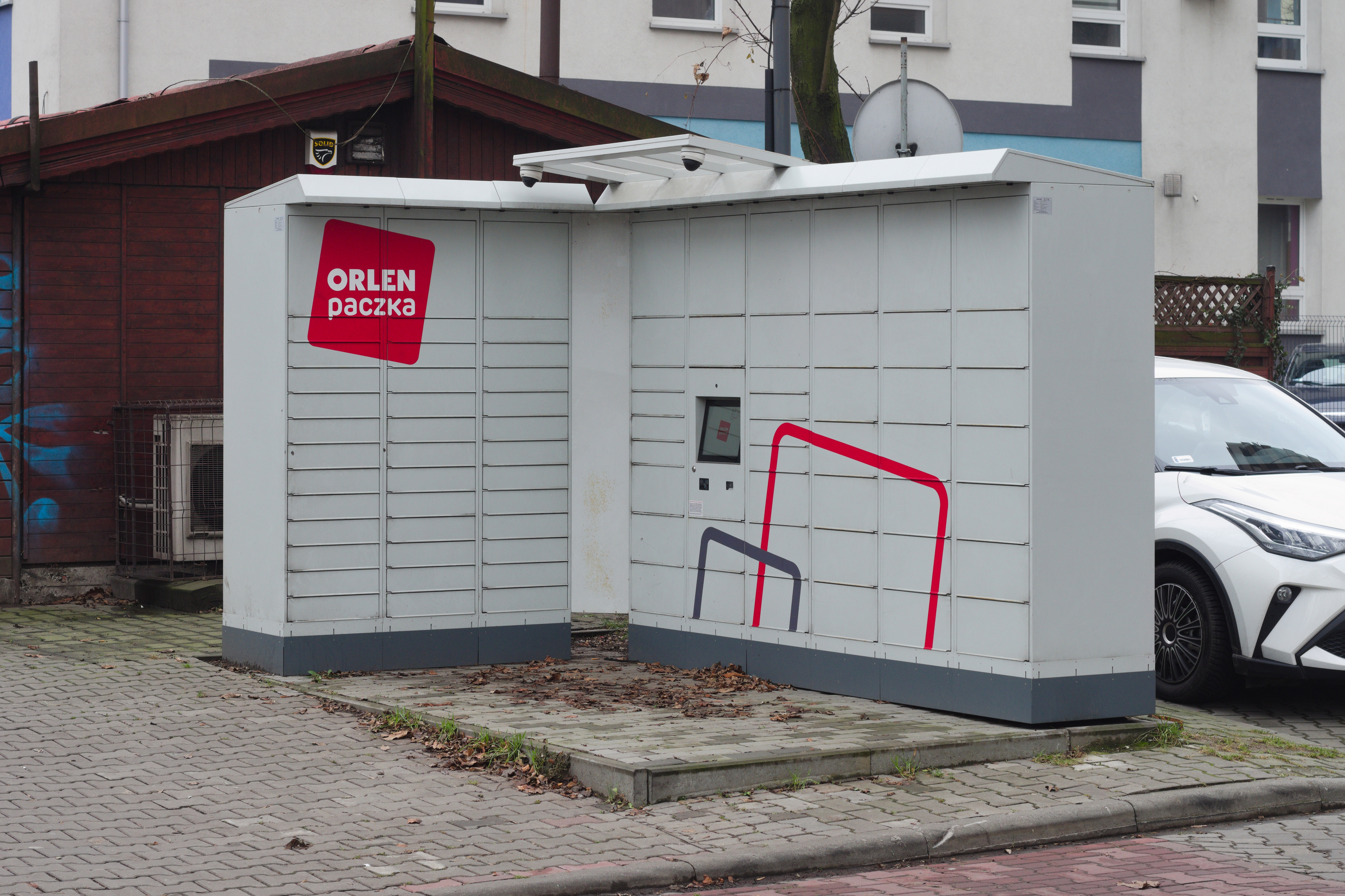
Orlen Paczka parcel locker in Bytom (November 2022)

In 2019, PKN Orlen opened its first petrol station in Slovakia through its Czech subsidiary Unipetrol under the Benzina brand. At the end of 2020, 20 Orlen stations were operating in Slovakia.

At the end of 2019, PKN Orlen and PZU established the "Sigma Bis" media agency.

PKN Orlen has been implementing a development strategy since 2018, which involves transforming the company into a multi-energy and commercial group. In April 2020, Orlen acquired 80% of Energa shares, and on 14 July 2020 announced that it obtained permission the European Commission's for the takeover of Grupa Lotos, first announced in 2018. On 1 August 2022, Orlen finalised the merger with Lotos.

In November 2020, PKN Orlen purchased 65% of the shares of the financially troubled newsagents chain Ruch SA. On 7 December 2020 Orlen signed an agreement to acquire 100% of shares in the media and press company "Polska Press sp. z o.o." and the transaction was carried out on 1 March 2021. This decision was met with criticism from Polish Ombudsman, Adam Bodnar, who expressed his concern about the risk to freedom of speech that this takeover poses as PKN Orlen is a state-owned company and the constitutional right to press freedom excludes the possibility of political influence on the press, even an indirect one.

In December 2020, PKN Orlen bought an agricultural biogas plant Bioenergy Project, which it will transform into a biomethane plant. To secure supplies, the company Biozec, responsible for the sale and distribution of thermal energy supplied by the biogas plant, was also acquired. In 2021, Orlen bought 4 wind farms: in February, the Kanin farm with a capacity of 20 MW, and in March, another three with a total capacity of 89.4 MW.

On 14 July 2020, PKN Orlen announced its intention to take over PGNiG, and on 10 May 2021, it submitted a takeover application to the Office of Competition and Consumer Protection. In October 2022, shareholders of PGNiG approved the company's takeover by PKN Orlen, this came after PKN Orlen Shareholders had done the same.

In 2020, the company announced its plans to become emission-neutral by 2050 becoming the first oil company from Central Europe to do so. In order to achieve this goal, by 2030, Orlen aims to reduce CO_{2} emissions from its current refining and petrochemical assets by 20% and emissions from power generation by 33% CO_{2}/MWh.

In June 2021, PKN Orlen opened its first Orlen w ruchu standalone convenience store in Warsaw, competing in this segment with Carrefour Express, Circle K and Żabka. In September 2021, the company entered the parcel locker sector with the launch of Orlen Paczka in co-operation with Poczta Polska.

In December 2022, PKN Orlen entered the Hungarian market with the takeover of 143 petrol stations from Hungary's MOL in a deal related to the acquisition of 410 petrol stations in Poland by MOL under an agreement between Orlen and Grupa Lotos. The sale was the result of the European Commission requiring PKN Orlen to divest its assets in order to approve the company's acquisition of Grupa Lotos in accordance with EU competition law.

In March 2023, PKN Orlen began to sponsor the Stadion im. Kazimierza Górskiego, located opposite the Orlen Arena in Płock. In the same month, Ukrainian oil company Ukrnafta signed a contract with PKN Orlen to allow the latter to export petrochemical products to Ukraine.

On 3 July 2023, the company renamed PKN Orlen to Orlen S.A. to reflect its diversification from fossil fuels. In September 2023, the European Commission approved the takeover by Orlen Group of the consumer retail division of the Austrian oil trading company Doppler-Gruppe, which operates 266 filling stations in Austria under the Turmöl discount brand.

In August 2023, the company's supervisory board conditionally approved an investment in an off-shore wind farm located on the Baltic Sea. The joint project between Orlen and Northland Power is aimed at achieving the company's goal of generating 9 GW of renewable energy capacity by 2030. The Baltic Power farm, located about 23 km off the coast, will consist of 76 wind turbines with a capacity of 15 MW each, providing energy to over 1.5 million households upon completion in 2026. By July 2026, 54 turbines had been installed. In 2024, Orlen bought a 240-MW wind and solar portfolio from EDP Renovaveis for $290 million. Orlen opened its first fast-charging station for EVs in 2025, with plans for 50 more within two years. In August 2026, Orlen acquired a project under construction, consisting of an 180 MW solar farm and a 36 MW wind farm.

In December 2023, the Polish government approved the construction of 24 new small modular reactor (SMR) units in six sites across the country. Orlen Synthos Green Energy (OSGE), a joint venture between Orlen and chemicals company Synthos, plans to deploy Poland's first small reactors by 2030. In August 2025, the first reactor was announced to be built in Wloclawek with a capacity of 0.6 GW.

Orlen will pay a dividend for 2023 in the amount of PLN 4.15 per share. The total value of the dividend is PLN 4,817,909.5 thousand. The dividend yield is 6.82%. The last listing with dividend rights took place on 18 September 2024, and the dividend payment date was set for 20 December 2024

== Sponsorship ==
PKN Orlen has sponsored the Polish Athletic Association, the Polish Volleyball Association, the Polish Olympic and Paralympic Committees, and various Polish motorsport competitors such as Bartosz Zmarzlik, Jakub Przygoński, Bartek Marszałek, Grupa Żelazny and Wojtek Bógdał.

In 2019, PKN Orlen sponsored Williams Racing and driver Robert Kubica in Formula One with €10 million. After Kubica's move to Alfa Romeo Racing in a reserve driver role in 2020, the Polish petrol retailer became the co-title sponsor of the team as Alfa Romeo Racing Orlen in 2020 and 2021 and as Alfa Romeo F1 Team Orlen in 2022. In January 2023, PKN Orlen signed a multi-year agreement with Scuderia AlphaTauri as a principal partner. Orlen's logo would continue to appear on the team's cars as they were renamed to RB in 2024. In November 2023, the company became an official sponsor of the ski jumping hill in Oberstdorf, Germany, presently known as ORLEN Arena Oberstdorf.

== Finances ==
| | 2010 | 2011 | 2012 | 2013 | 2014 | 2015 | 2016 | 2017 | 2018 | 2019 | 2020 | 2021 | 2022 | 2023 | 2024 | 2025 |
|---|---|---|---|---|---|---|---|---|---|---|---|---|---|---|---|---|
| Sales revenue (PLN billions) | 83.5 | 107.0 | 120.1 | 113.9 | 106.8 | 88.3 | 79.6 | 95.4 | 109.7 | 111.2 | 86.2 | 131.3 | 282.4 | 372.8 | 294.9 | 267.8 |
| Operating income (PLN billions) | 3.1 | 2.1 | 2.0 | 0.3 | −4.7 | 4.3 | 7.5 | 8.7 | 7.2 | 5.4 | 3.9 | 13.9 | 48.4 | 28.1 | 9.7 | 10.0 |
| Net income (PLN billions) | 2.4 | 2.4 | 2.3 | 0.2 | −5.8 | 2.8 | 5.3 | 6.7 | 5.6 | 4.3 | 2.8 | 11.1 | 39.7 | 20.7 | 2.8 | 2.5 |
| Total assets (PLN billions) | 51.1 | 58.7 | 52.6 | 51.6 | 46.7 | 48.1 | 55.6 | 60.7 | 64.1 | 71.2 | 84.0 | 106.8 | 313.2 | 264.2 | 255.4 | 265.0 |
| Total equity (PLN billions) | 24.2 | 26.8 | 28.3 | 27.6 | 20.4 | 24.2 | 29.3 | 35.2 | 35.7 | 38.6 | 42.4 | 52.6 | 143.1 | 153.2 | 146.8 | 144.5 |
| Employees | 22,040 | 22,380 | 21,956 | 21,565 | 20,305 | 19,932 | 19,730 | 20,262 | 21,282 | 22,337 | 33,377 | 35,424 | 64,494 | 66,554 | 67,809 | 66,563 |

Changes in the scope of the business, particularly the acquisition of Energa in 2020 and the mergers with LOTOS and PGNiG in 2022, limit comparability over time.

=== Orlen losses ===
In early 2025, PKN Orlen announced a loss of approximately $378 million due to prepayments for Venezuelan oil that was never delivered.

The deal was reportedly facilitated by oil trader, Hannon International Middle East DMCC. In December 2023, Orlen’s Swiss subsidiary transferred significant sums to Hannon and another intermediary, Horizon Global, with payments totaling $230 million and $100 million, respectively. However, Venezuela’s state oil company, PDVSA, never received the funds, and the oil was not delivered, resulting in substantial financial losses for Orlen.

The former CEO of OTS, identified as Samer A., is suspected of authorizing the fraudulent transaction without proper oversight. He was arrested in the United Arab Emirates in early 2025 and may be extradited to Poland to face charges related to corruption and mismanagement.

Orlen has so far managed to recover $100 million through a settlement, but investigations are ongoing to trace the remaining funds and determine the full extent of involvement of all parties.

== Brands and subsidiaries of Grupa Orlen (Orlen Group) ==
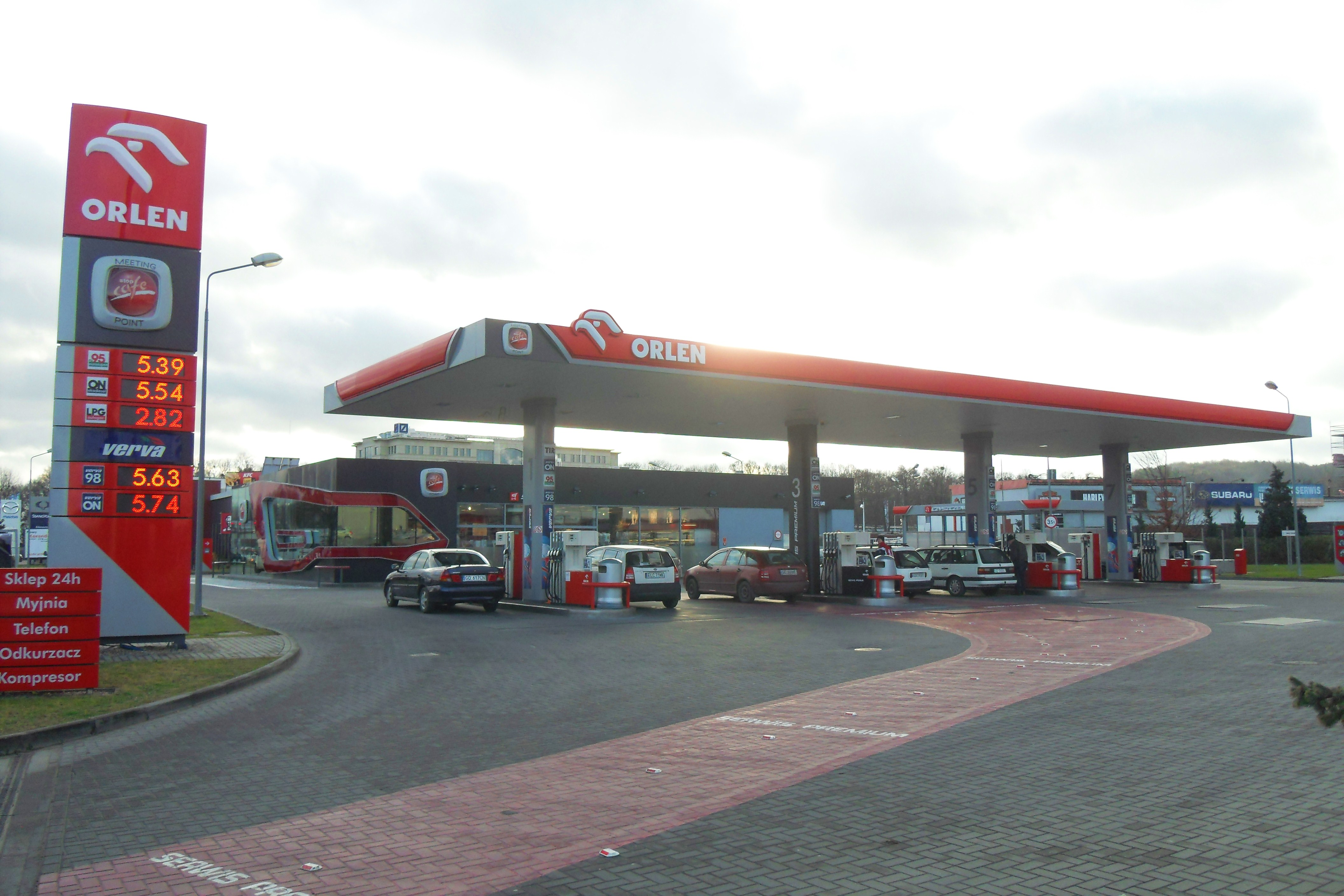
Orlen station in Poland

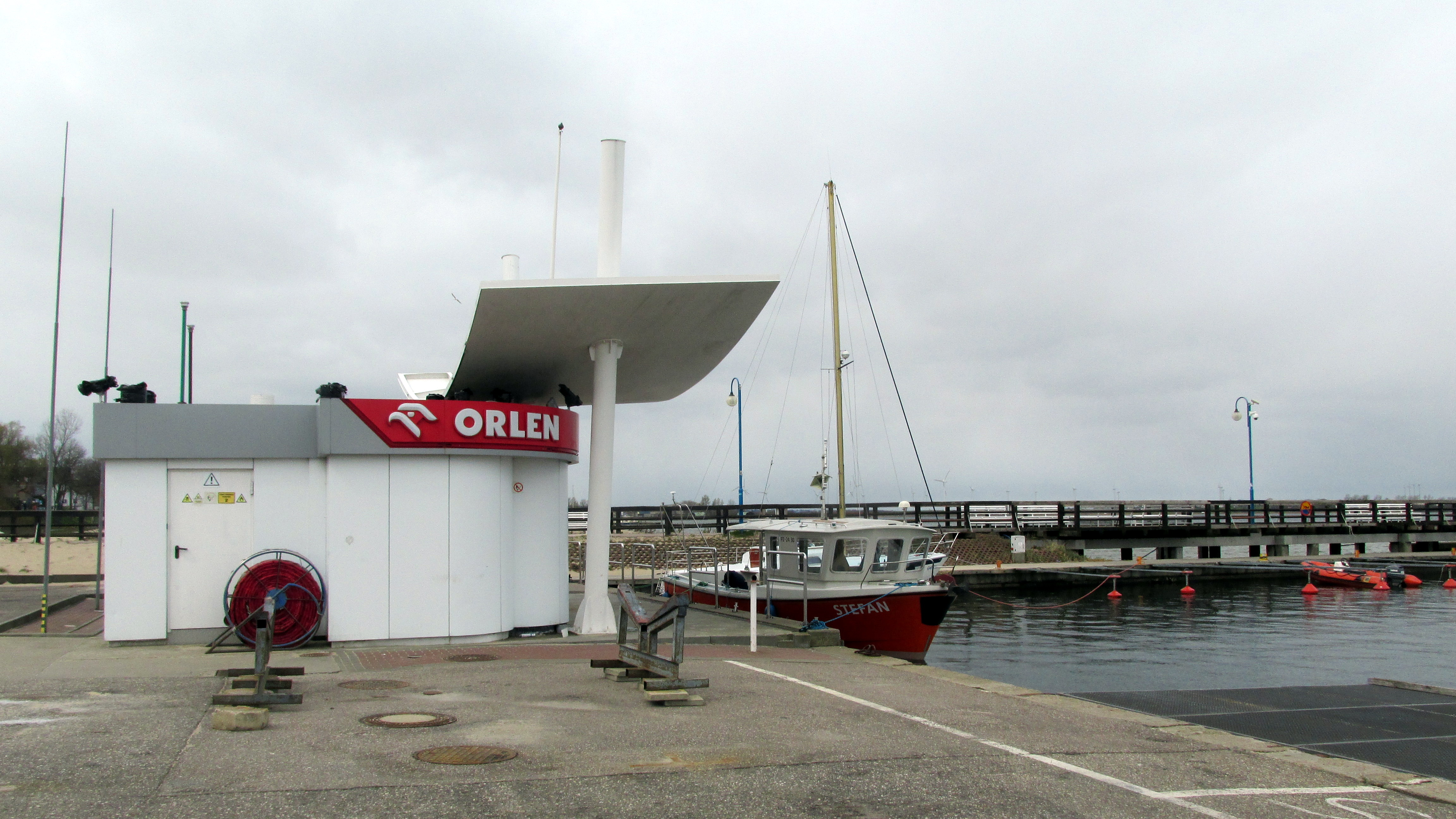
Orlen station for refueling boats in Poland

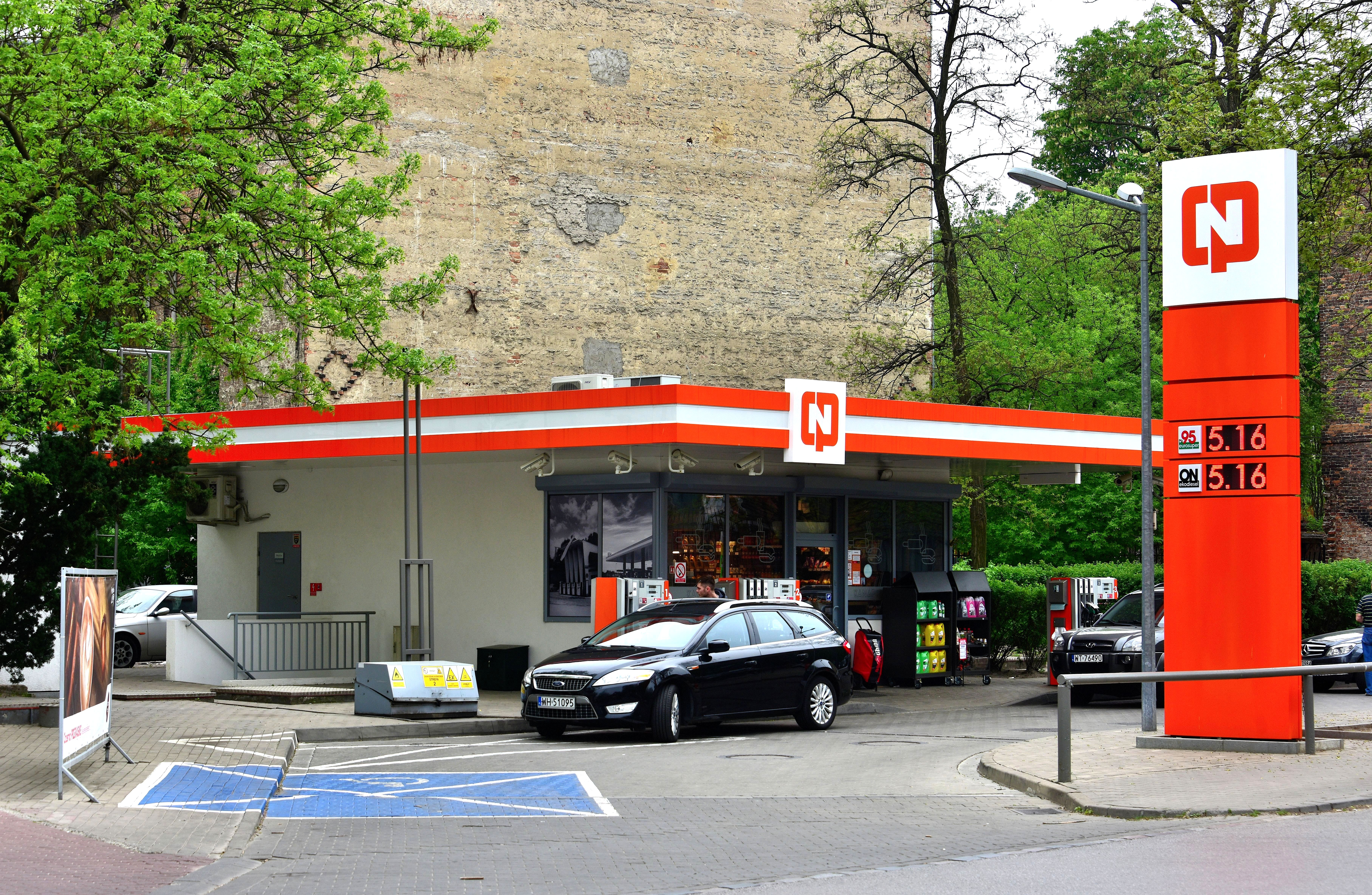
CPN station in Poland

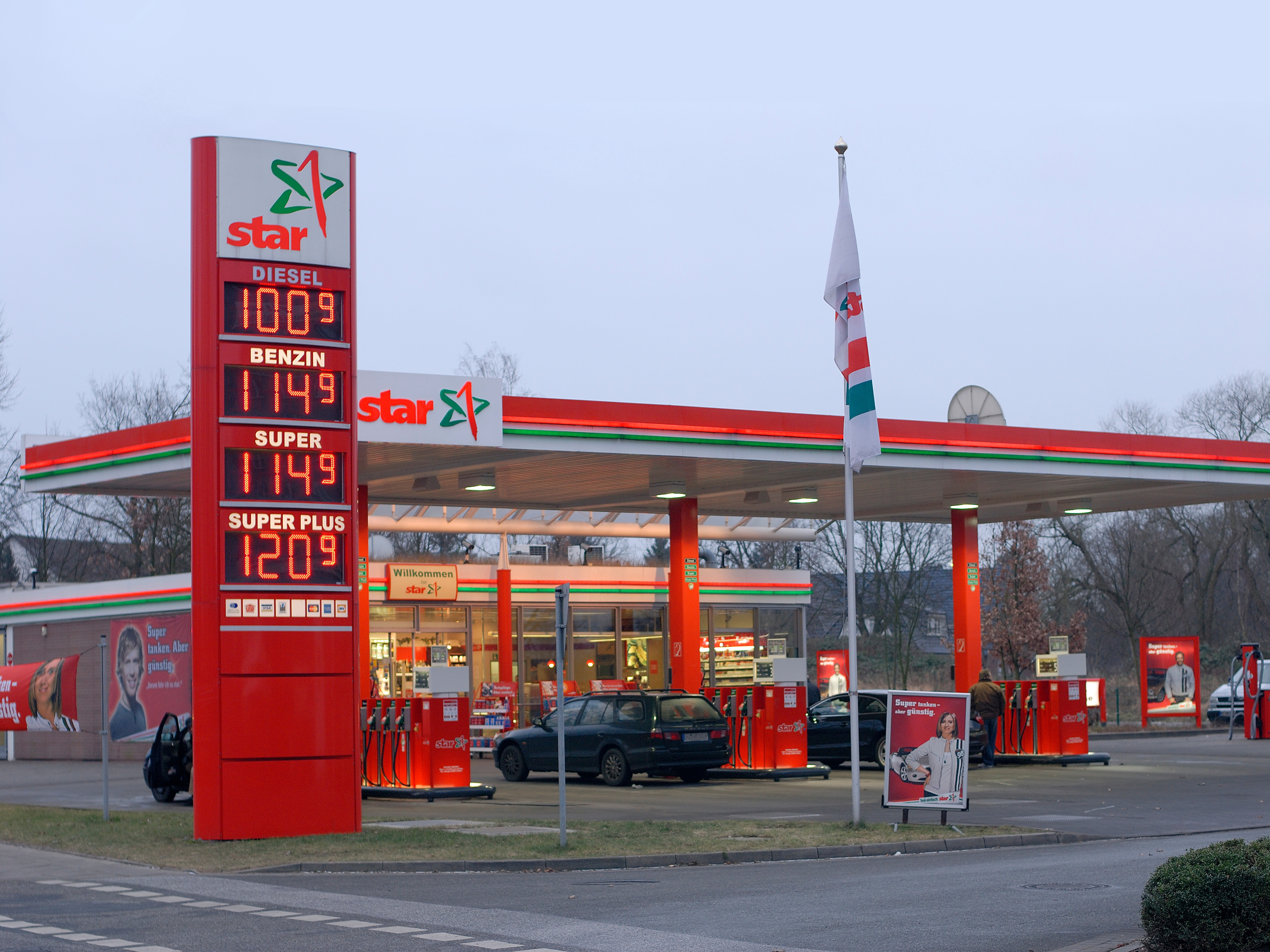
Star station in Germany

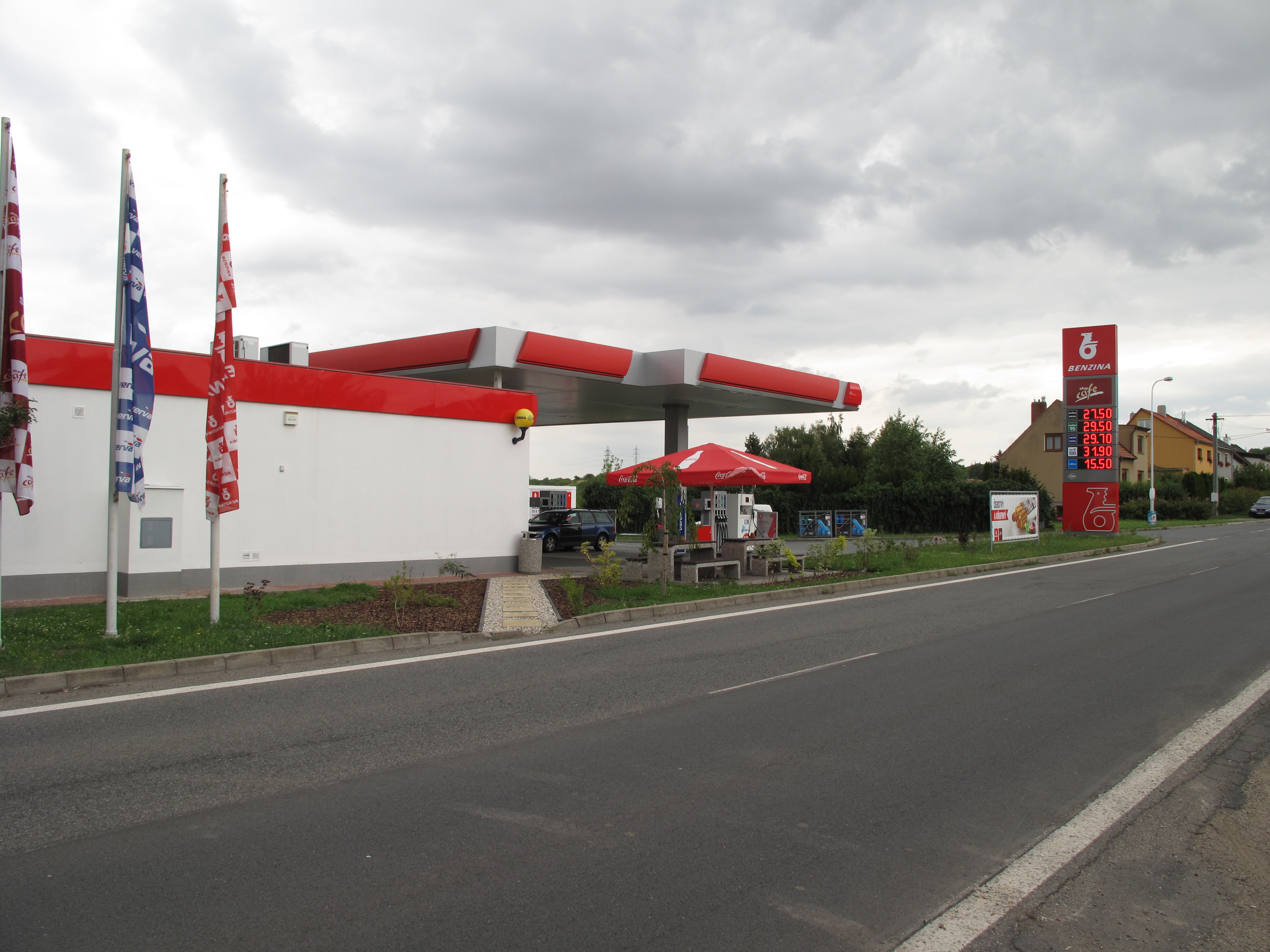
Benzina station in the Czech Republic

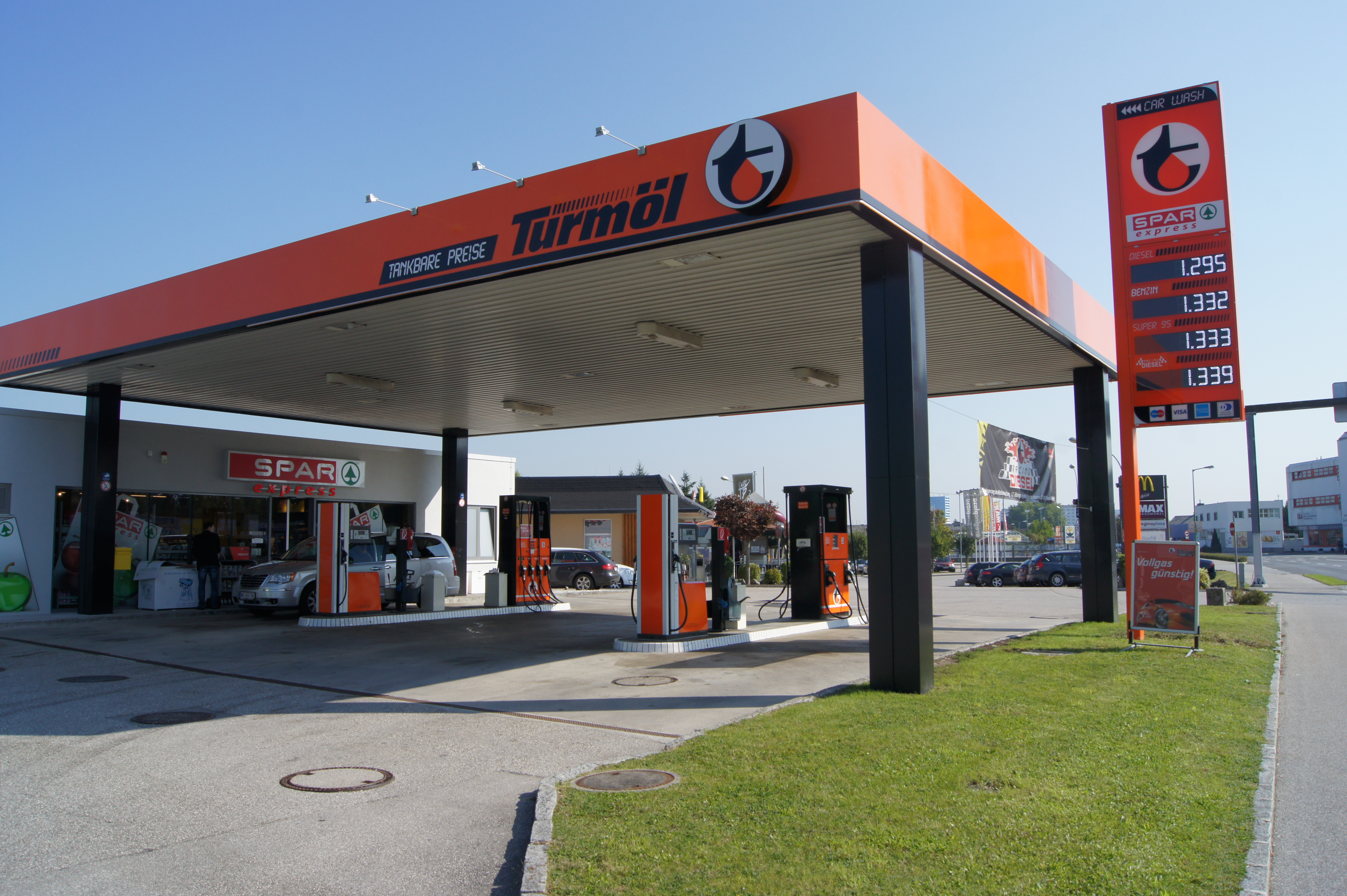
Turmöl station in Austria

=== Brands of Orlen ===
- Orlen (Polish, Czech and Slovak market petrol station brand)
  - CPN (Polish revived Communist-era petrol station monopoly brand, active in one location in Warsaw)
  - Petrochemia Płock (Polish revived petrol station brand, active in one location in Bodzanów near Płock)
- Star (German market petrol station brand)
- Unipetrol (Czech national petrol firm)
- Orlen Lietuva (Lithuanian market petrol station brand)
- Benzina (Czech and Slovak market petrol station brand)
- Turmöl (Austrian market petrol station brand)

=== Orlen Group structure ===
Orlen Group structure
| Name | Description |
CEO division
| Anwil S.A. | production of PVC, nitrogenous fertilisers & other chemicals |
| Orlen Ochrona | security services |
| Orlen Upstream | crude exploration |
| Sigma Bis S.A. | marketing services |
| Unipetrol a.s. | leading Czech refining & petrochemical group |
CFO division
| Orlen Capital AB | eurobond issue |
| Orlen Centrum Usług Korporacyjnych | book keeping & accounting services |
| Orlen Holding Malta Limited | shareholding in other entities |
| Orlen Insurance Ltd | Orlen Group's assets insurance |
| Orlen Usługi finansowe | financial services |
Development division
| AB Orlen Baltics Retail | liquid fuel trade & marketing |
| Orlen Deutschland GmbH | retail sales of fuel across Germany |
Production division
| AB Orlen Lietuva | crude processing, logistics and marketing of petroleum products |
| Baltic Power | production, distribution & trading of electric energy |
| Basell Orlen Polyolefins | production, distribution & marketing of polyethylene and polypropylene |
| Orlen Południe S.A. | crude processing, production & marketing of fuels |
| Orlen Serwis S.A. | maintenance services |
Retail sales division
| Orlen Budonaft | construction and fuel stations service |
| Orlen Centrum Serwisowe | retail outlets service |
| Orlen Laboratorium S.A. | laboratory services |
| Orlen Projekt S.A. | civil engineering & process design services |
Wholesale and international trade division
| Orlen trading Switzerland GmbH | trading division |
| IKS Solino S.A. | underground storage of crude & fuels; salt production & marketing |
| Kopalnia Soli Lubień | underground storage of crude & fuels; salt production & marketing |
| Orlen Asfalt | production & marketing of bitumen products |
| Orlen Aviation Sp. z o.o. | liquid fuels trade |
| Orlen KolTrans S.A. | rail shipment & maintenance of the rail stock |
| Orlen Oil | production & marketing of lub oils and lubricants |
| Orlen Paliwa Sp. z o.o. | liquid fuels (petrol and diesel fuel) and Ekoterm Plus light heating oil |
| SHIP - Service SA | supplies of marine fuels, sea & land cargo shipment |
Corporate division
| Orlen Administracja | office, administrative & catering services |
| Orlen Eko | waste disposal, HSE |
| PPPT S.A. | research & development of technologies |

== List of Presidents of the Management Board ==
- Andrzej Modrzejewski – 16 April 1999 – 8 February 2002
- Zbigniew Wróbel – 8 February 2002 – 28 July 2004
- Jacek Walczykowski – 28 July 2004 – 16 August 2004
- Igor Chalupec – 21 September 2004 – 18 January 2007
- Piotr Kownacki – 18 January 2007 – 28 February 2008
- Wojciech Heydel – 30 April 2008 – 18 September 2008
- Dariusz Krawiec – 18 September 2008 – 16 December 2015
- Wojciech Jasiński – 16 December 2015 – 5 February 2018
- Daniel Obajtek – 5 February 2018 – 5 February 2024
- Witold Literacki (acting) – 6 February 2024 – 11 April 2024
- Ireneusz Fąfara – 11 April 2024 – present

== See also ==
- List of petroleum companies
- List of largest Polish companies
- List of companies of Poland
