= Central Park North =

Central Park North may refer to:

- Central Park North, a section of 110th Street (Manhattan), New York City
- Central Park North (album), a 1969 album by the Thad Jones/Mel Lewis Jazz Orchestra
