= Centrala Produktów Naftowych =

- Company type: State corporation Spółka Akcyjna
- Industry: Oil and gas
- Founded: 14 August 1944
- Founder: Polish State Treasury
- Defunct: 7 September 1999
- Fate: Merged
- Successor: Orlen
- Headquarters: Warsaw, Poland
- Products: Natural gas Petroleum

Centrala Produktów Naftowych (CPN) was a Polish state-owned company involved in the storage, transport, wholesale and retail distribution of petroleum products, primarily liquid fuels and lubricants, and other consumables for motor vehicles and vessels. At its peak, it had over 1,400 fuel stations and a fleet of almost 600 tank trucks. Until the end of communism and the demise of the Polish People's Republic it acted as a monopoly. CPN also provided purchase and resale of used mineral oils to refineries for reprocessing. The company organized the transport of liquid fuels using tank trucks, rail tankers and pipelines.

== History ==
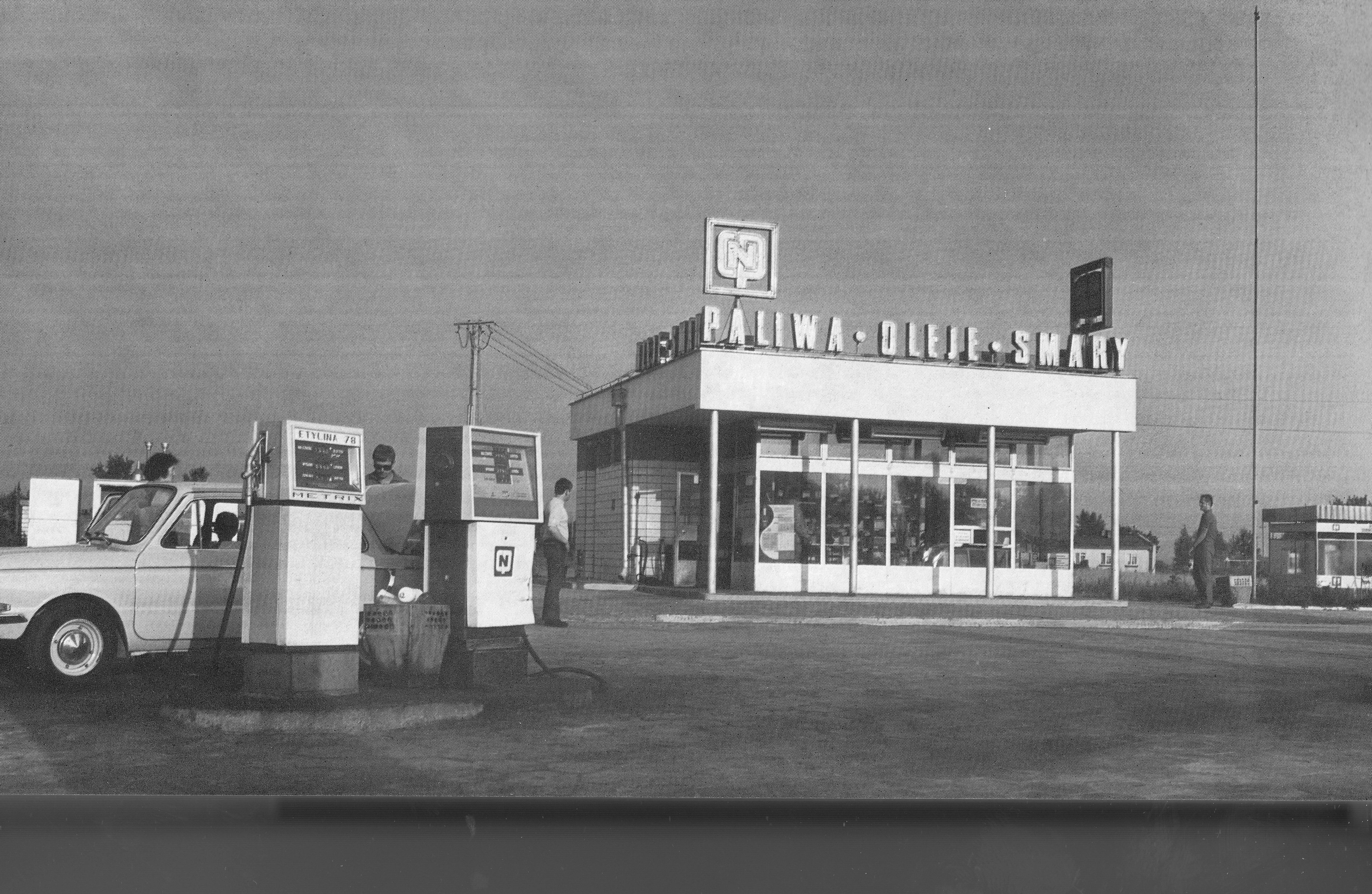
CPN petrol station in Modlin in the 1970s.

While World War II was still ongoing, in July 1944, a state institution was established, whose task was to secure the oil infrastructure that had survived on Polish soil after years of occupation and warfare, and to resume fuel distribution activities. Specially established oil operational teams moved behind the advancing front and took over subsequent facilities. In the official act of the Polish Committee of National Liberation of 14 August 1944, the name of the organization was established as the Polish Oil Monopoly. In October, the name was changed to the State Office for the Sale of Oil Products. Another name change took place on 3 December 1945, when, by virtue of the order of the Minister of Industry, the state-owned enterprise Centrala Produktów Naftowych was established.

By December 31, 1945, there were 26 CPN petrol stations in the country, with an average tank capacity of 6,000 l and average annual sales of 41,000 l of fuel. Initially, the stations were located right next to the edge of the roadway, and the sales rooms were often located in nearby houses. Later, these were wooden and tin kiosks, and then brick buildings. In 1950, there were 413 CPN stations. From 1957, manual fuel dispensers began to be replaced by electric ones. In 1957, after the expansion of fuel bases in the east of the country, CPN began the transit of fuels, petroleum products and chemicals from the USSR to the GDR. In 1957, small spare parts, automotive accessories and car cosmetics were introduced to the market at petrol stations. In December 2018, the brand was reactivated, one petrol station was launched in Warsaw.

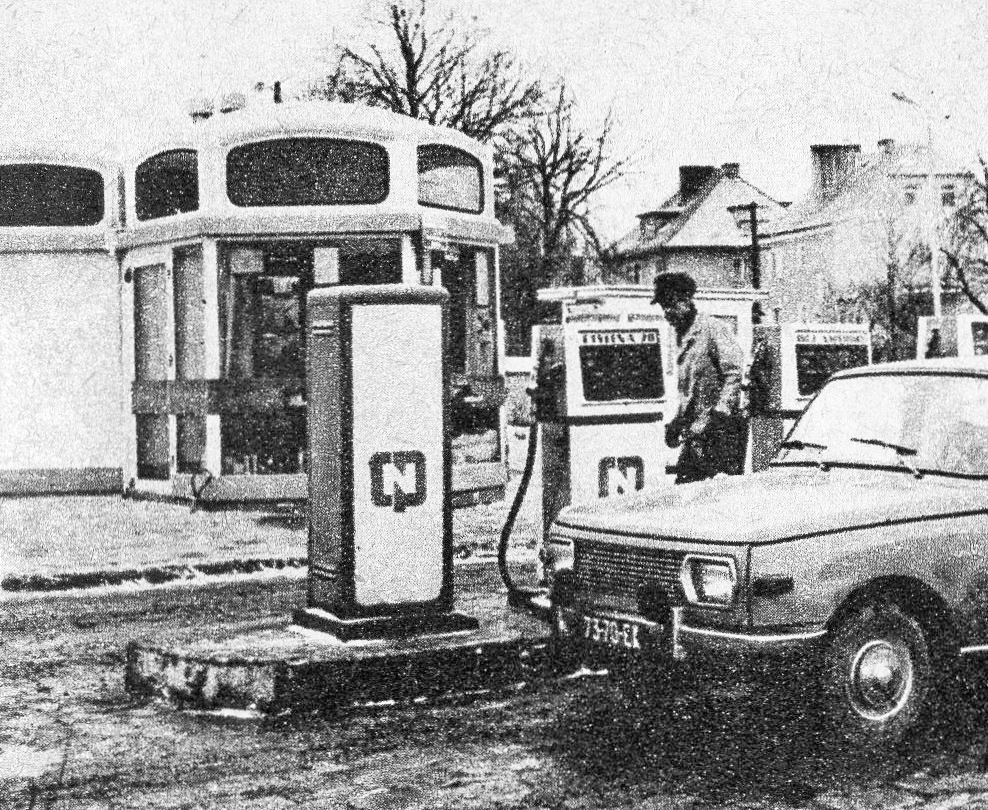
CPN petrol station in Człuchów, 1972.

By the order of the Minister of Industry and Trade of 22 April 1947, issued in agreement with the Minister of Treasury and the President of the Central Planning Office, it was decided that there would be a "Centrala Produktów Naftowych - a separate state-owned enterprise". In 1957, as a result of reorganization, it was renamed Centralny Zarząd Obrotu Produktami Naftowymi "CPN". In 1958, the enterprise regained its former name, which was merged with the abbreviation "CPN" - Centrala Produktów Naftowych "CPN". In 1960, the number of petrol stations in Poland exceeded 1,000. In 1960, as part of the "deglomeration of the capital city industry", Warsaw" was separated from the CPN structures and then the Central Assembly Workshops for Oil Distribution Equipment in Warsaw were liquidated. In 1964, within the CPN organization, the 675-kilometer Polish section of the Druzhba pipeline was launched and Russian oil was supplied to the refinery in Płock and the plant in Schwedt (East Germany). The PERN "Przyjaźń" Oil Pipeline Operation Company was established. In 1968, installation of liquefied gas filling machines for tourist bottles at fuel stations began. In 1973, CPN began operating in the field of bunkering vessels, i.e. supplying fuels and lubricants for ships in the port complexes of Gdańsk-Gdynia and Szczecin-Świnoujście; in 1982, the CPN bunker fleet numbered 15 units. In 1980, the number of stations was 1,280 (average tank capacity 69,000 l, average annual sales per station 2,039,000 l). In 1981, there were 43 fuel laboratories operating in the country, employing 160 people, and a total of 14,200 people and 5,600 petrol station agents were employed in CPN. In 1982, the number of petrol stations reached 1,312. Regardless of the CPN network, there were about 15,000 so-called garage stations in the country - located on the premises of enterprises, construction sites, state farms, SKRs, POMs, mines, etc. In December 1995, CPN was transformed into a sole-shareholder company of the State Treasury: CPN S.A.

In December 1996, due to the structure it managed, the company was entered into the register of enterprises of special economic and defense importance.

In May 1998, the Council of Ministers decided to establish an oil concern. It was created as a result of the merger of Centrala Produktów Naftowych CPN SA and Petrochemia Płock SA. The activities related to the creation of the new entity were formalized on September 7, 1999, when it adopted the name Polski Koncern Naftowy SA. On April 3, 2000, the Extraordinary General Meeting of Shareholders decided to give the company the trade name Orlen.
