= Wieszowa =

- Village
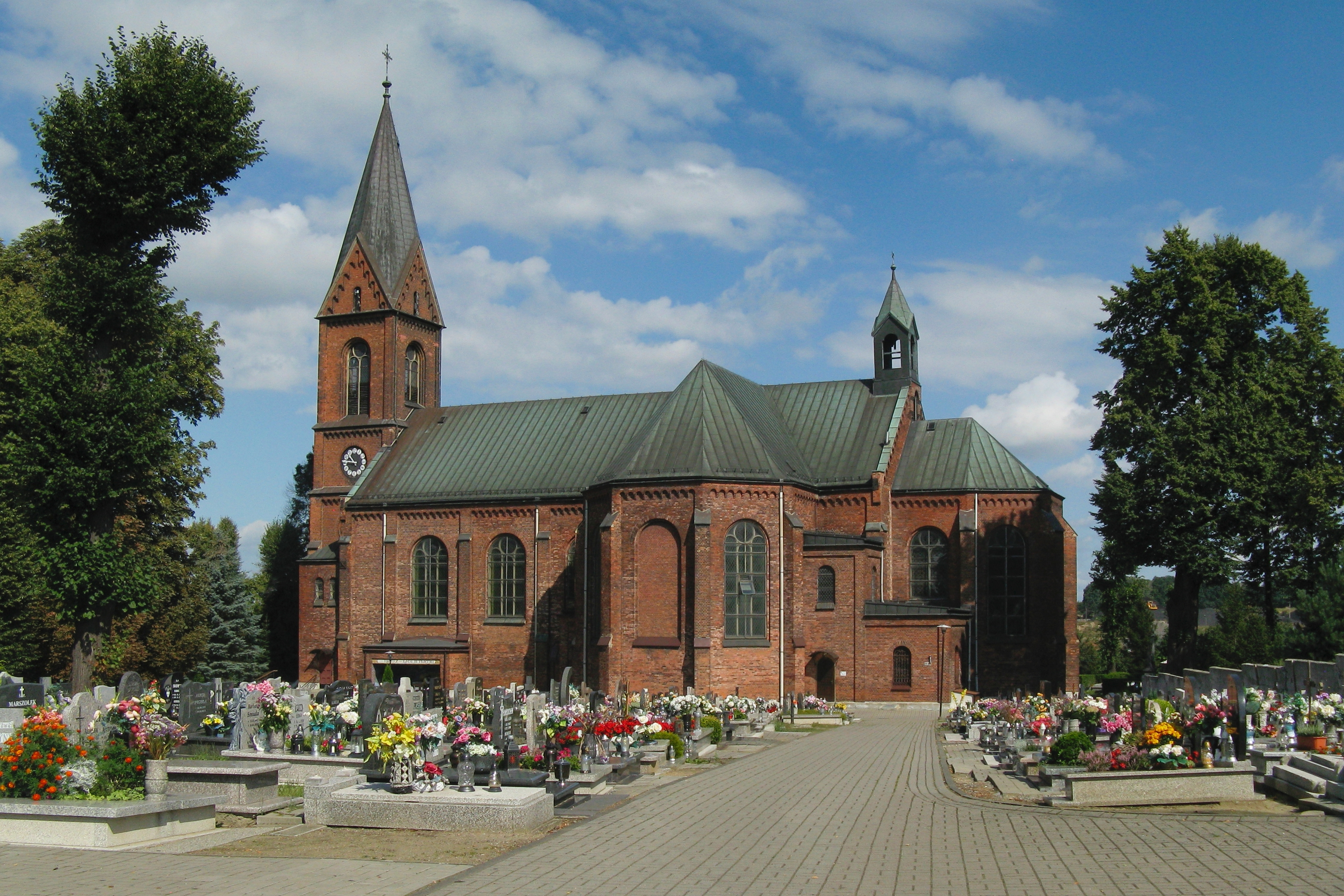
- Holy Trinity church in Wieszowa

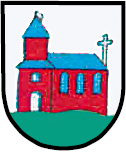
- Coat of arms

- Location within Poland
- Coordinates: 50°24′N 18°46′E
- Country: Poland
- Voivodeship: Silesian
- County: Tarnowskie Góry
- Gmina: Zbrosławice
- Highest elevation: 300 m (980 ft)
- Lowest elevation: 240 m (790 ft)

Population
  - Total: 2,630
- Time zone: UTC+1 (CET)
  - Summer (DST): UTC+2 (CEST)
- Postal code: 42-672
- Vehicle registration: STA
- Primary airport: Katowice Airport
- Website: http://www.wieszowa.pl/

Wieszowa [vjɛˈʂɔva] is a village in the administrative district of Gmina Zbrosławice, within Tarnowskie Góry County, Silesian Voivodeship, in southern Poland.
