= Łubie =

- Village
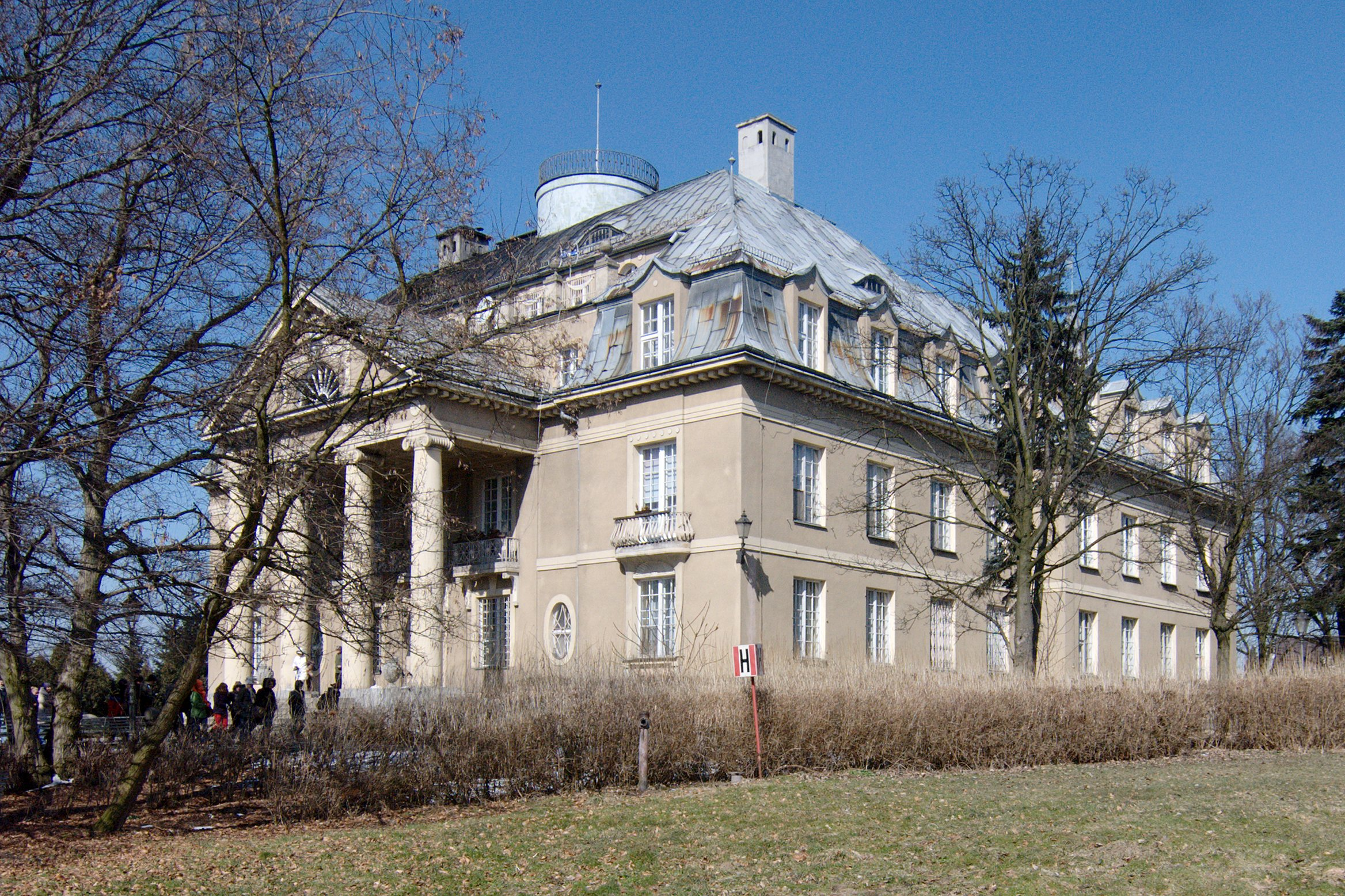
- Baildon family manor

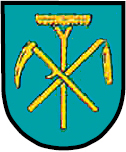
- Coat of arms

- Location within Poland
- Coordinates: 50°26′24″N 18°39′8″E
- Country: Poland
- Voivodeship: Silesian
- County: Tarnowskie Góry
- Gmina: Zbrosławice
- Population: 796

Łubie [ˈwubjɛ] is a village in the administrative district of Gmina Zbrosławice, within Tarnowskie Góry County, Silesian Voivodeship, in southern Poland.
