= Czekanów, Silesian Voivodeship =

Czekanów
- Village
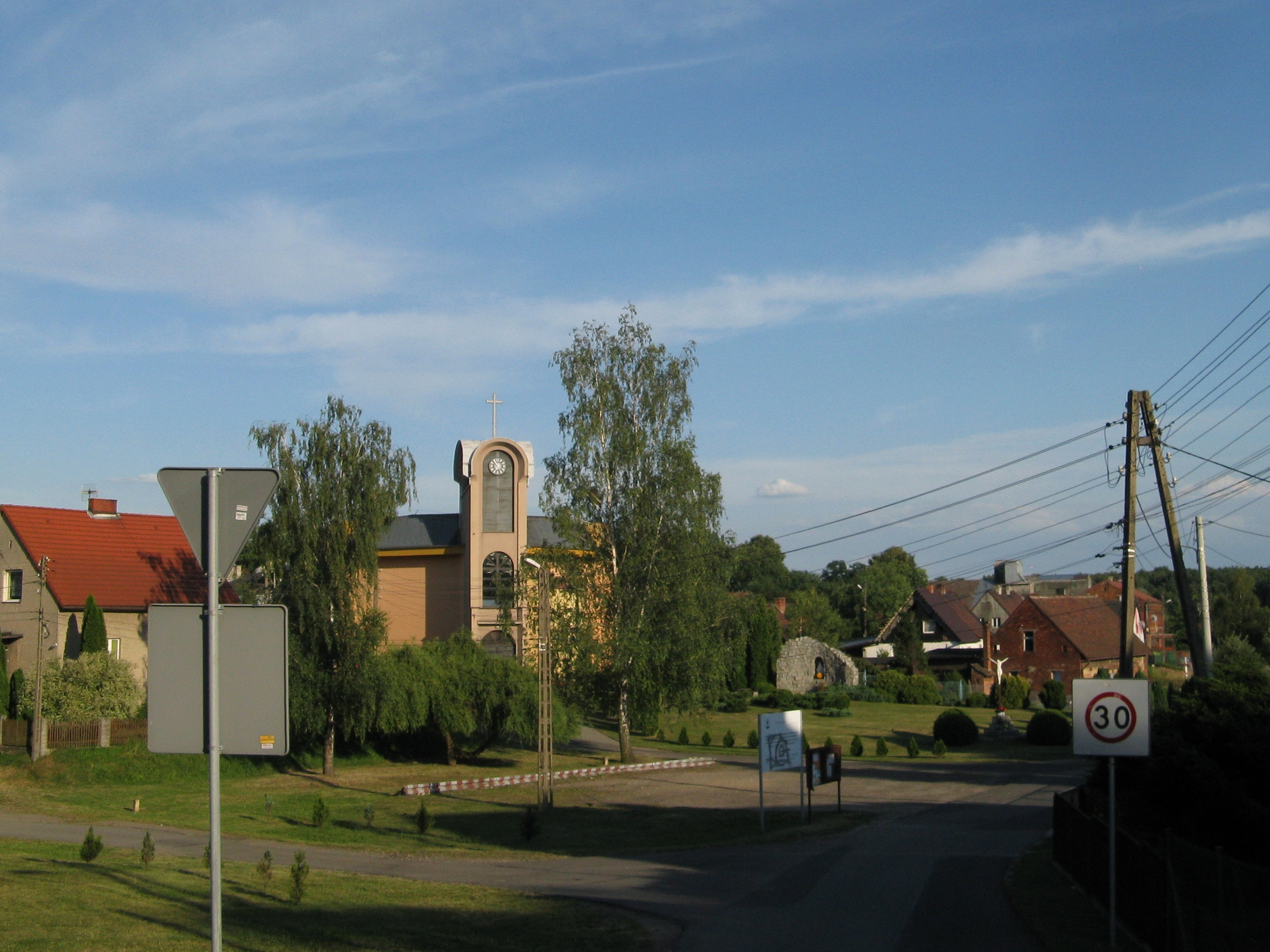

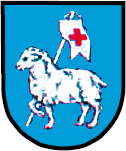
- Coat of arms

- Location within Poland
- Coordinates: 50°20′49″N 18°44′1″E
- Country: Poland
- Voivodeship: Silesian
- County: Tarnowskie Góry
- Gmina: Zbrosławice

Population
  - Total: 1,000
- Postal code: 42-677
- Primary airport: Katowice Airport

Czekanów [t͡ʂɛˈkanuf] is a village in the administrative district of Gmina Zbrosławice, within Tarnowskie Góry County, Silesian Voivodeship, in southern Poland.
