= Miedary =

- Village
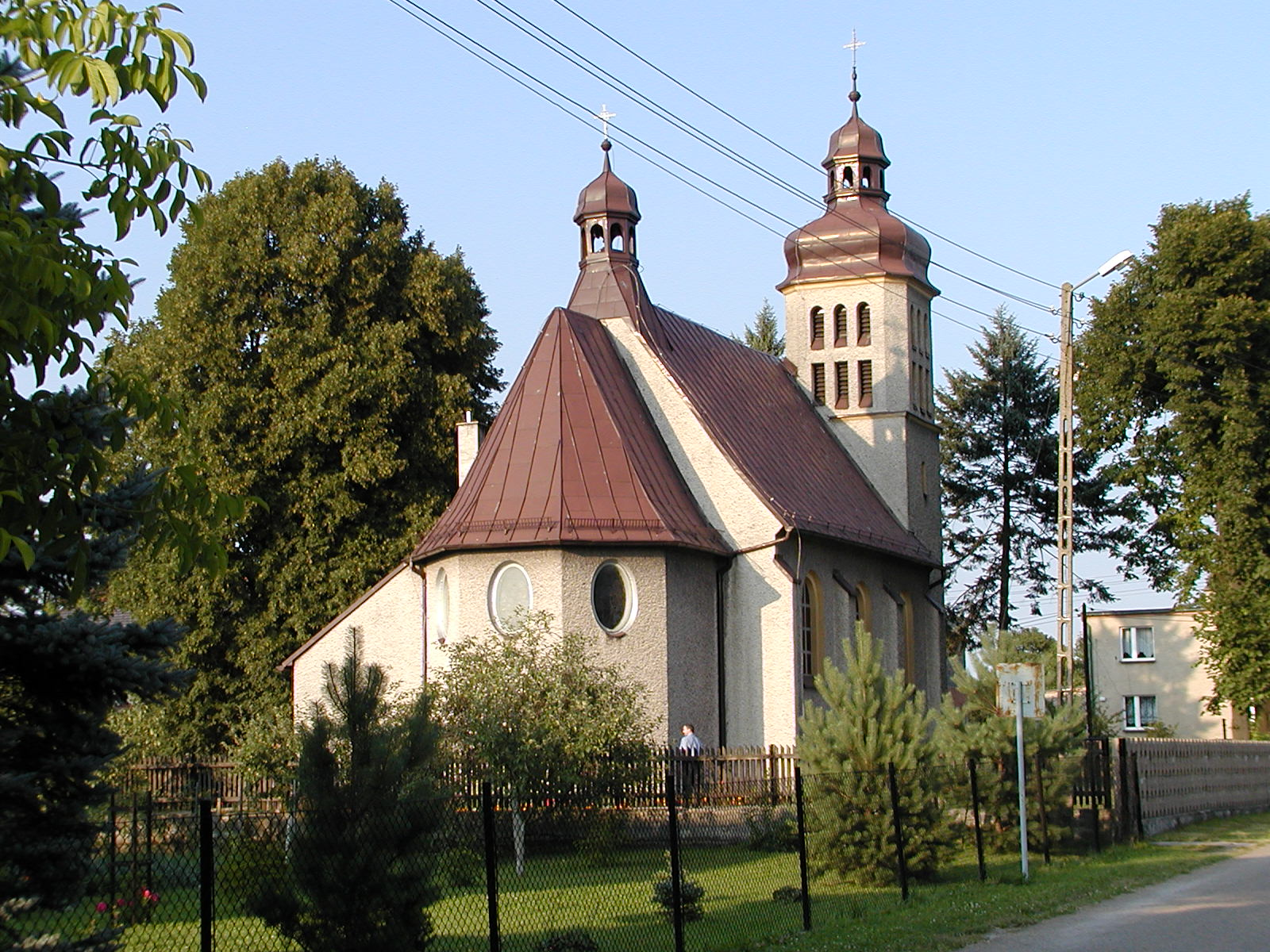
- Church in Miedary

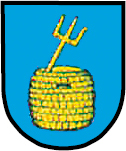
- Coat of arms

- Location within Poland
- Coordinates: 50°27′25″N 18°45′47″E
- Country: Poland
- Voivodeship: Silesian
- County: Tarnowskie Góry
- Gmina: Zbrosławice
- Population: 1,267

Miedary [mjɛˈdarɨ] is a village in the administrative district of Gmina Zbrosławice, within Tarnowskie Góry County, Silesian Voivodeship, in southern Poland.
