= Koty, Silesian Voivodeship =

Koty
- Village
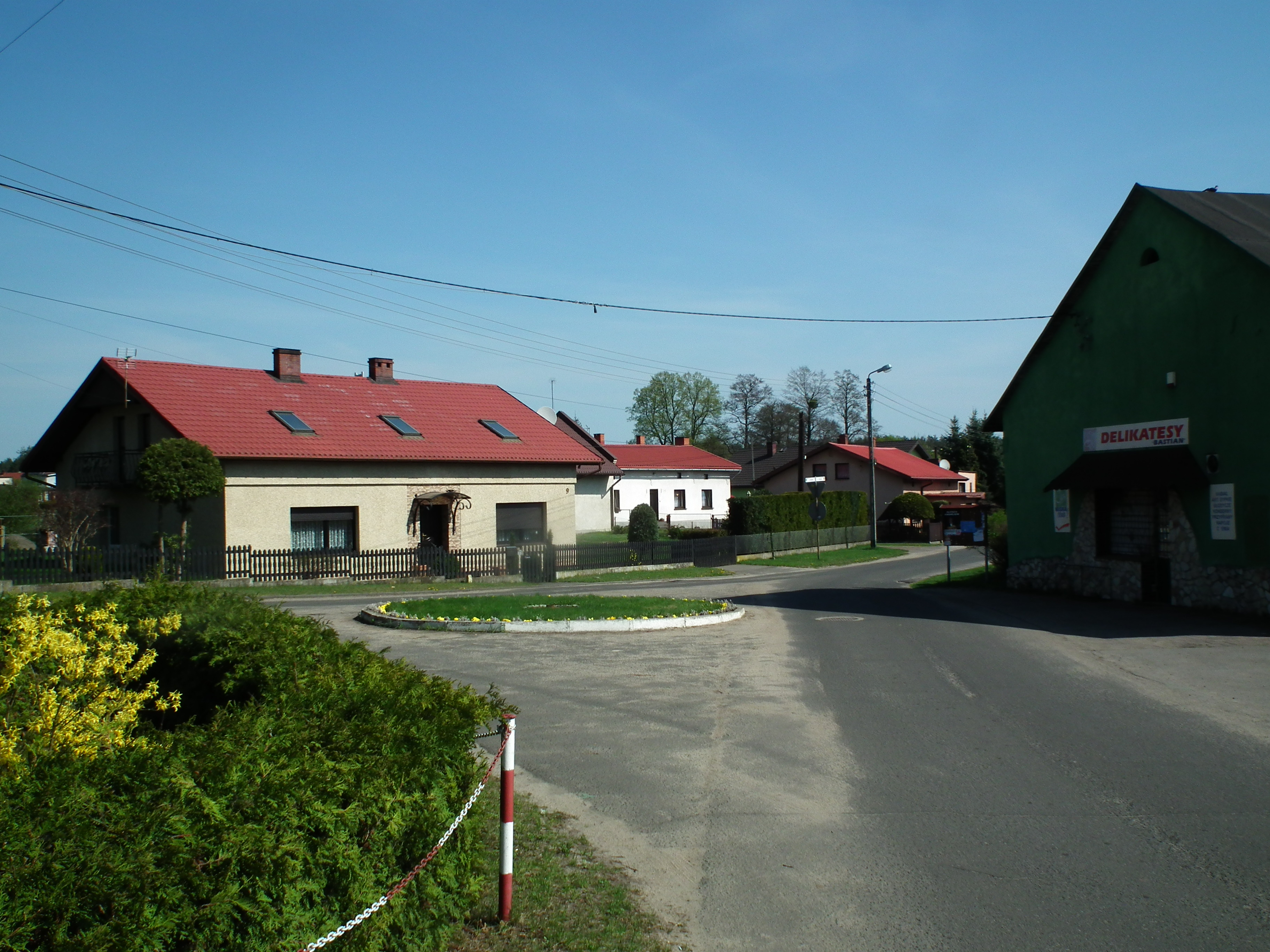

- Location within Poland
- Coordinates: 50°33′4″N 18°41′58″E
- Country: Poland
- Voivodeship: Silesian
- County: Tarnowskie Góry
- Gmina: Tworóg
- Population: 852

Koty [ˈkɔtɨ] is a village in the administrative district of Gmina Tworóg, within Tarnowskie Góry County, Silesian Voivodeship, in southern Poland.
