= Ziemięcice =

- Village
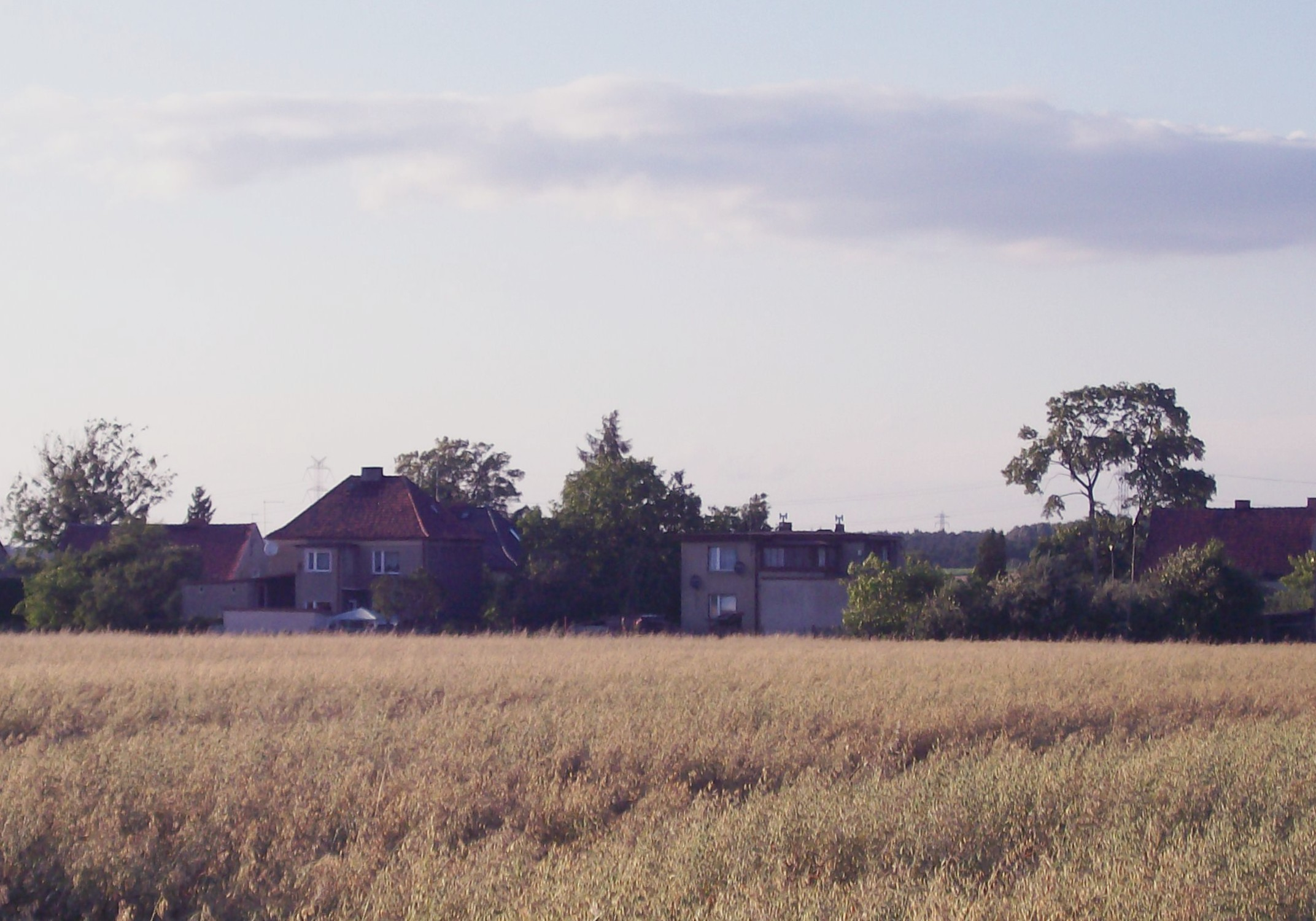

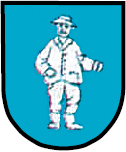
- Coat of arms

- Location within Poland
- Coordinates: 50°22′N 18°43′E
- Country: Poland
- Voivodeship: Silesian
- County: Tarnowskie Góry
- Gmina: Zbrosławice

Population
  - Total: 1,025
- Postal code: 42-675
- Website: Official website

Ziemięcice [ʑɛmjɛnˈt͡ɕit͡sɛ] (German: Ziemientzitz, 1939-1945: Ackerfelde Ober Schlesien) is a village in the administrative district of Gmina Zbrosławice, within Tarnowskie Góry County, Silesian Voivodeship, in southern Poland.
