= Wilkowice, Tarnowskie Góry County =

Wilkowice
- Village
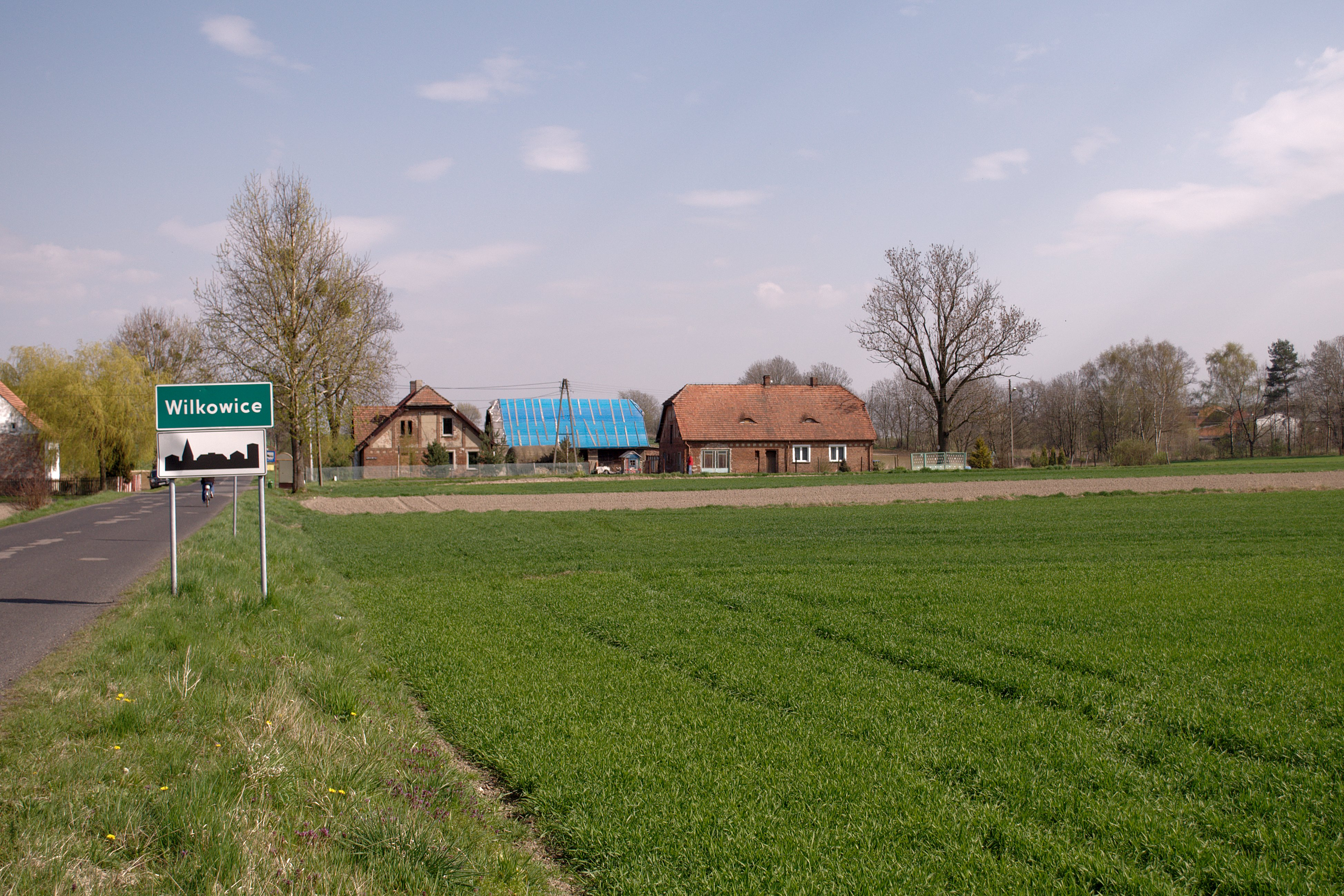

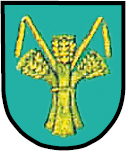
- Coat of arms

- Location within Poland
- Coordinates: 50°26′13″N 18°45′14″E
- Country: Poland
- Voivodeship: Silesian
- County: Tarnowskie Góry
- Gmina: Zbrosławice

Population
  - Total: 510
- Postal code: 42-674

Wilkowice [vilkɔˈvit͡sɛ] is a village in the administrative district of Gmina Zbrosławice, within Tarnowskie Góry County, Silesian Voivodeship, in southern Poland.
