= Jaśkowice, Silesian Voivodeship =

Jaśkowice
- Village
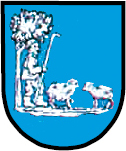
- Coat of arms

- Location within Poland
- Coordinates: 50°24′47″N 18°39′52″E
- Country: Poland
- Voivodeship: Silesian
- County: Tarnowskie Góry
- Gmina: Zbrosławice

Population
  - Total: 141
- Postal code: 42-674
- Vehicle registration: STA
- Primary airport: Katowice Airport

Jaśkowice [jaɕkɔˈvit͡sɛ] is a village in the administrative district of Gmina Zbrosławice, within Tarnowskie Góry County, Silesian Voivodeship, in southern Poland.
