= Brynek =

- Village
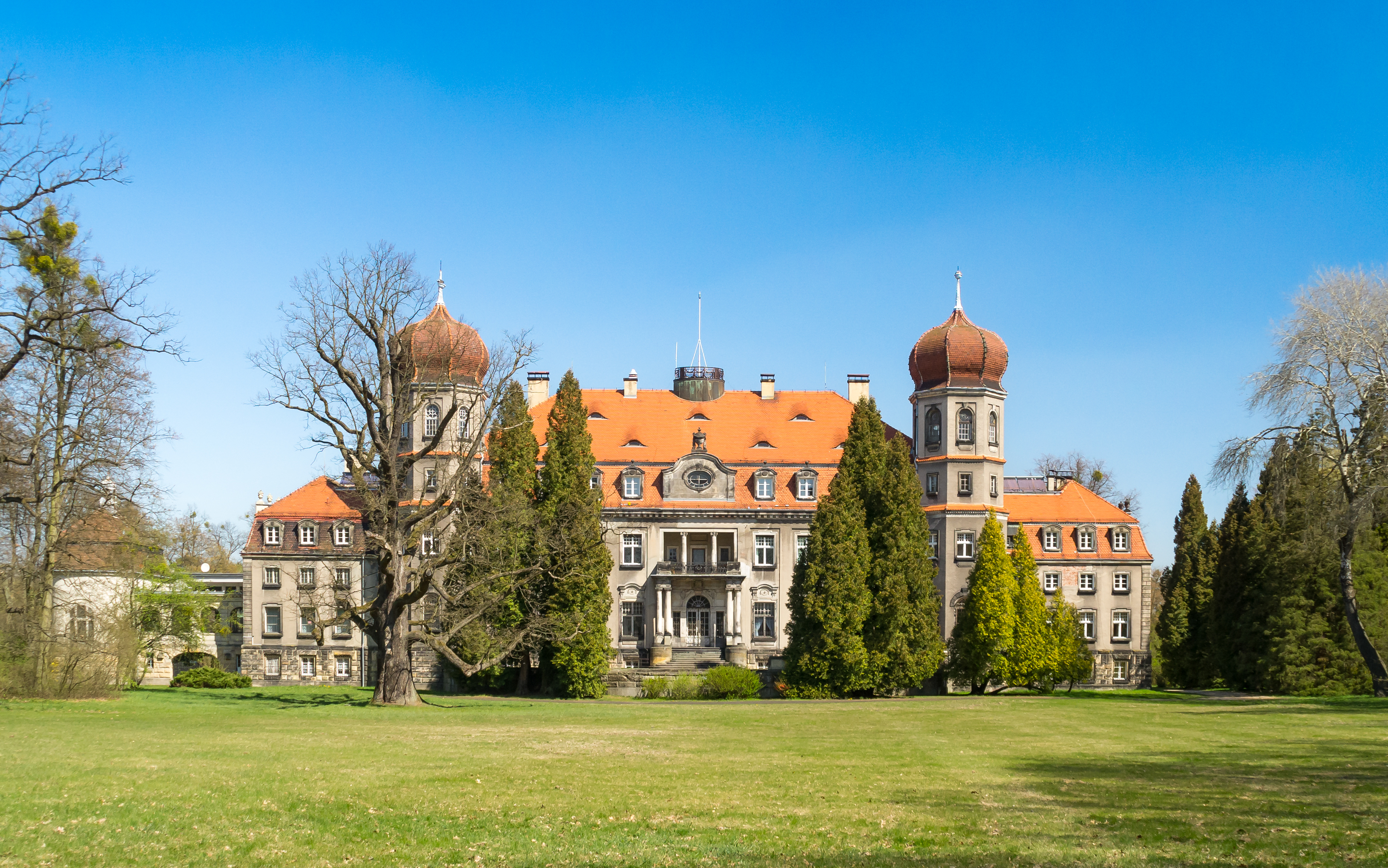
- Brynek Palace

- Location within Poland
- Coordinates: 50°31′N 18°43′E
- Country: Poland
- Voivodeship: Silesian
- County: Tarnowskie Góry
- Gmina: Tworóg

Brynek [ˈbrɨnɛk] is a village in the administrative district of Gmina Tworóg, within Tarnowskie Góry County, Silesian Voivodeship, in southern Poland.
