= Wojska, Silesian Voivodeship =

Wojska
- Village
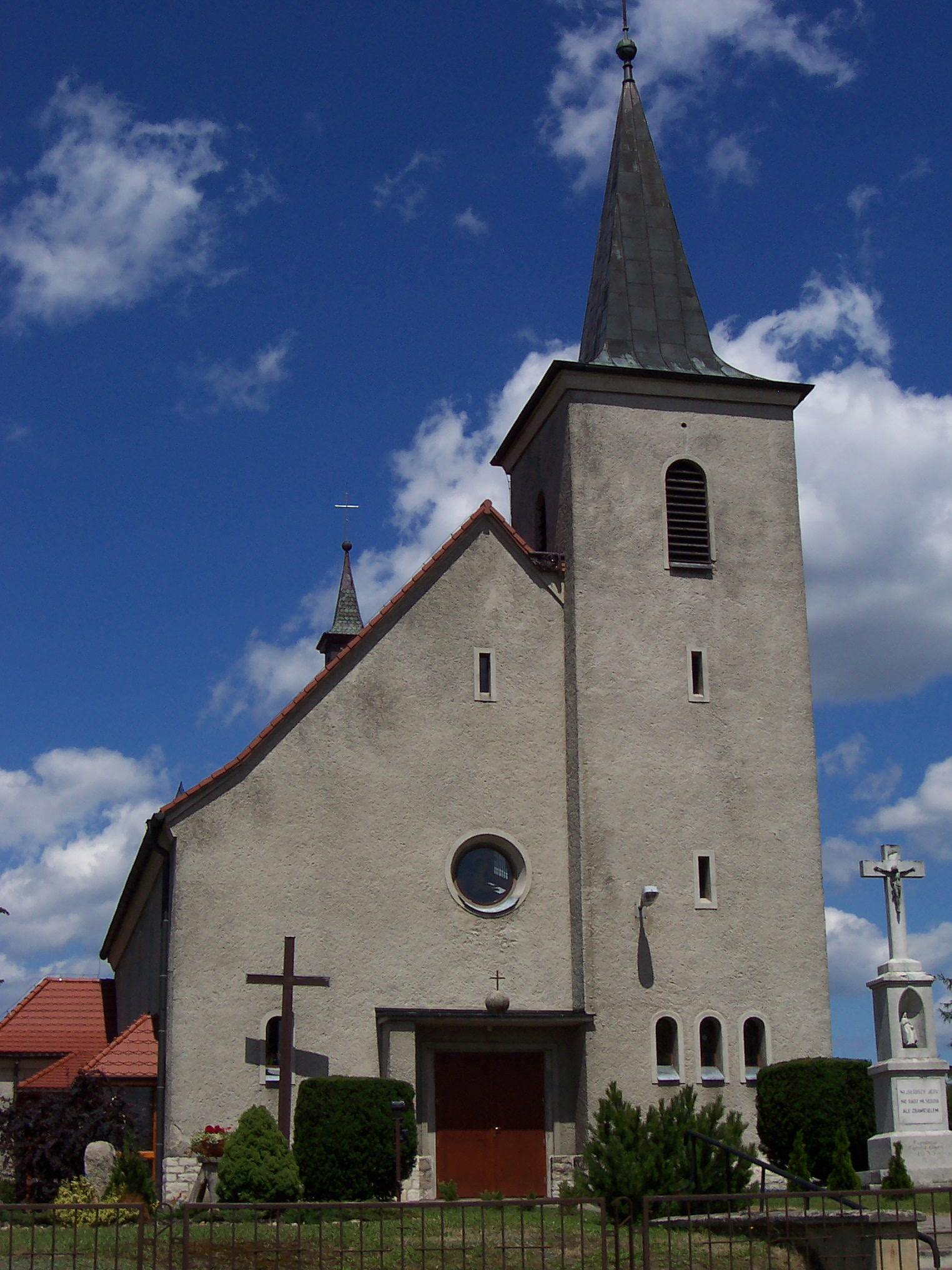
- Catholic church

- Location within Poland
- Coordinates: 50°29′N 18°39′E
- Country: Poland
- Voivodeship: Silesian
- County: Tarnowskie Góry
- Gmina: Tworóg
- Population: 760

Wojska [ˈvɔi̯ska] is a village in the administrative district of Gmina Tworóg, within Tarnowskie Góry County, Silesian Voivodeship, in southern Poland.
