= Karchowice =

- Village
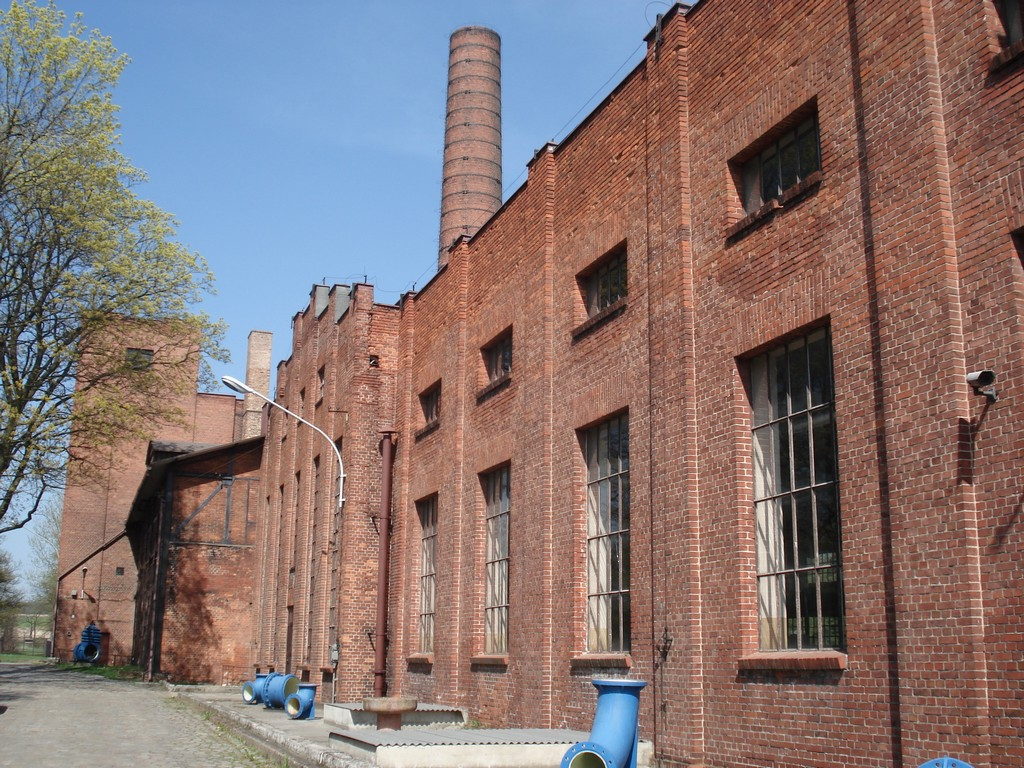
- Pumping station Zawada

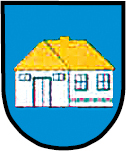
- Coat of arms

- Location within Poland
- Coordinates: 50°23′39″N 18°40′58″E
- Country: Poland
- Voivodeship: Silesian
- County: Tarnowskie Góry
- Gmina: Zbrosławice

Population
  - Total: 308
- Postal code: 42-674
- Vehicle registration: STA
- Primary airport: Katowice Airport
- Website: http://www.karchowice.prv.pl

Karchowice [karxɔˈvit͡sɛ] is a village in the administrative district of Gmina Zbrosławice, within Tarnowskie Góry County, Silesian Voivodeship, in southern Poland.

== Monuments ==
In Karchowice is located The Historic Waterworks Station ‘ZAWADA’ which is included in the Industrial Monuments Route of Silesia since the beginning of its existence. The Historic Waterworks Station ‘ZAWADA’ in Karchowice has been a landmark in the borough of Zbrosławice since 1895, when the first deep well was officially opened and started supplying drinking water to the residential parts of the western counties in the Upper Silesian Industrial Region including such cities as Zabrze, Bytom, Ruda Śląska, Gliwice and others.
