= Boruszowice =

- Village
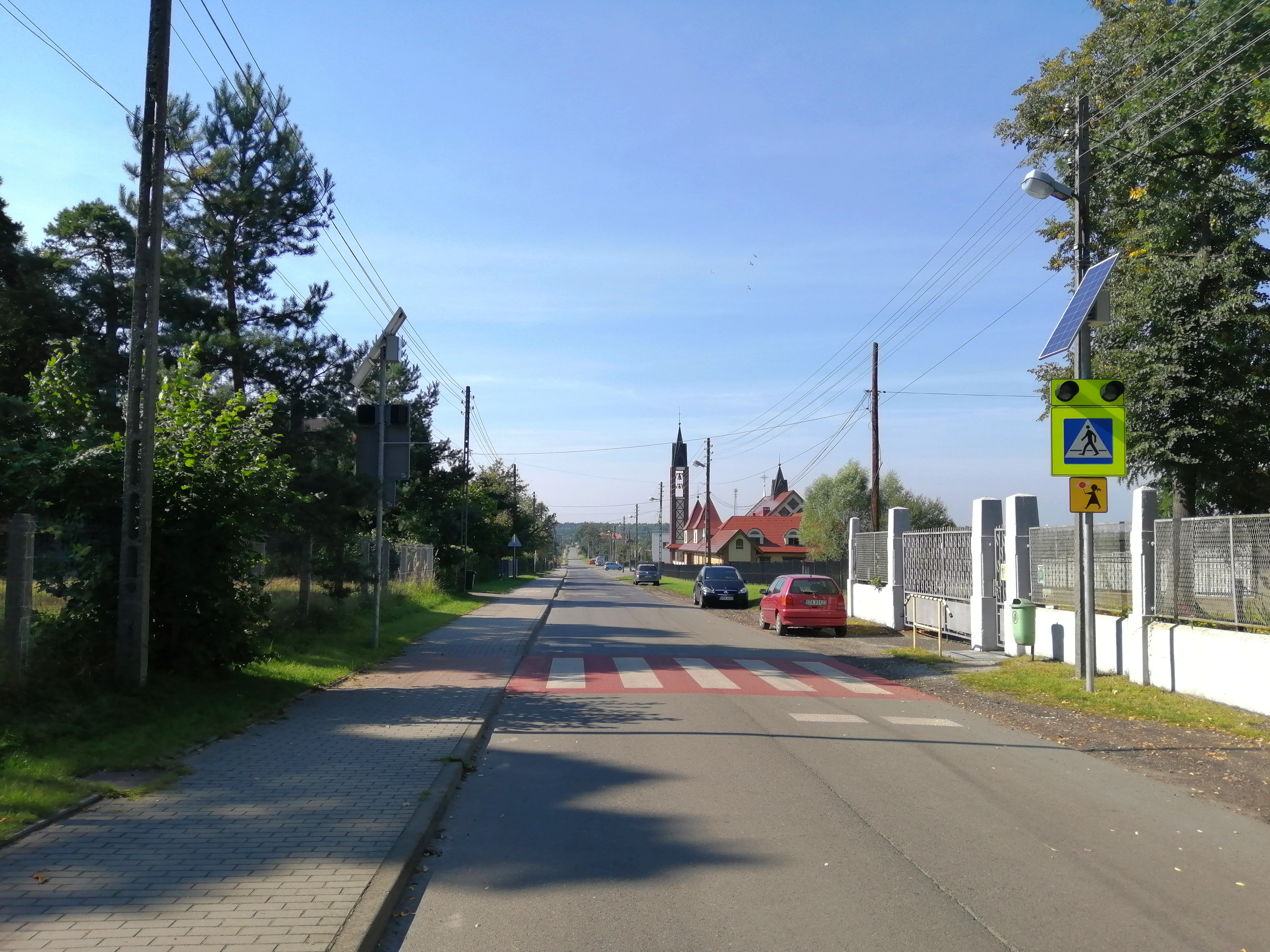

- Location within Poland
- Coordinates: 50°31′N 18°46′E
- Country: Poland
- Voivodeship: Silesian
- County: Tarnowskie Góry
- Gmina: Tworóg
- Population: 1,000
- Website: www.boruszowicehanusek.yoyo.pl

Boruszowice [bɔruʂɔˈvit͡sɛ] is a village in the administrative district of Gmina Tworóg, within Tarnowskie Góry County, Silesian Voivodeship, in southern Poland.
