= Księży Las =

- Village
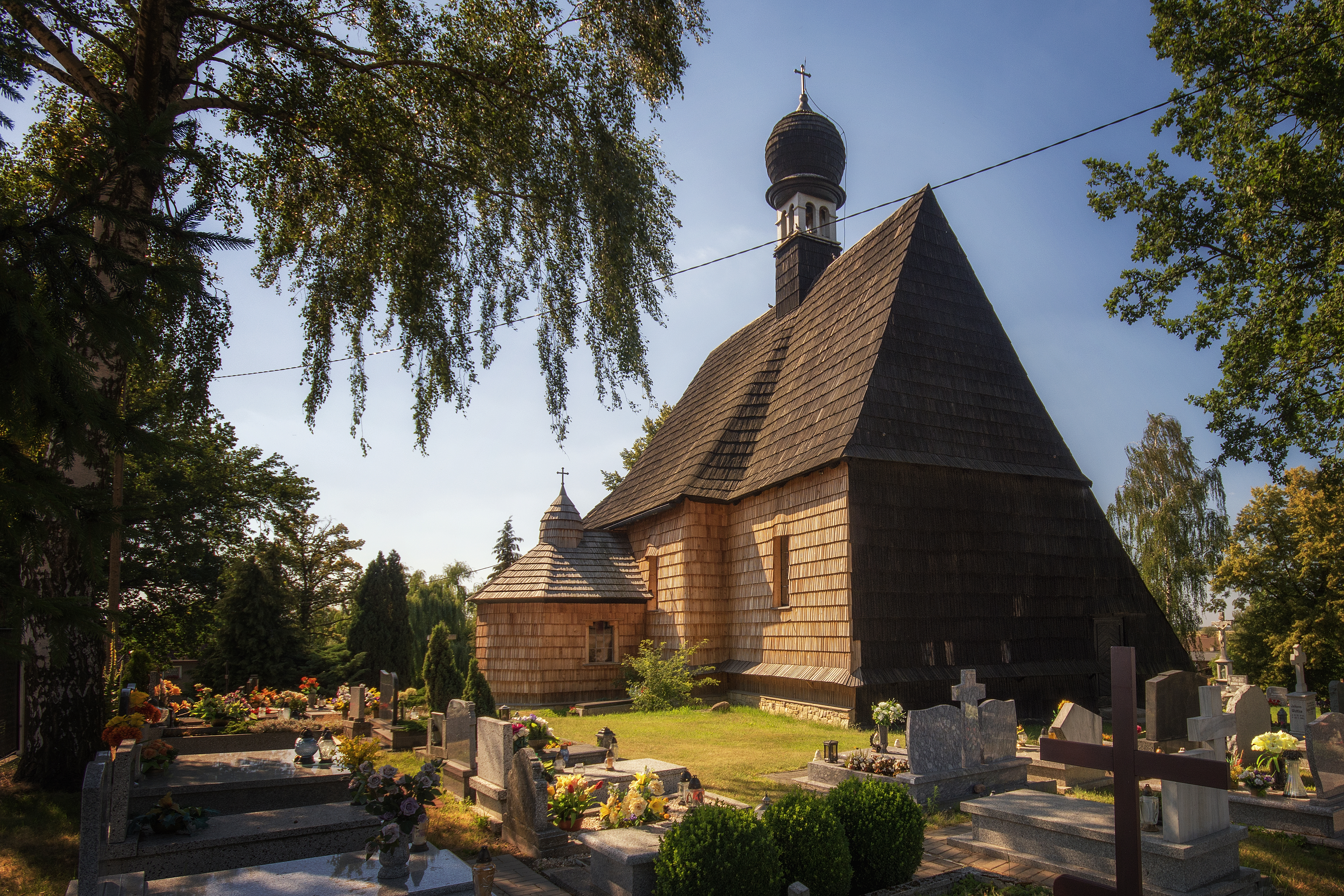
- Saint Michael church in Księży Las

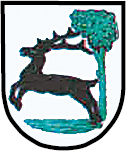
- Coat of arms

- Location within Poland
- Coordinates: 50°26′33″N 18°41′57″E
- Country: Poland
- Voivodeship: Silesian
- County: Tarnowskie Góry
- Gmina: Zbrosławice

Population
  - Total: 459
- Time zone: UTC+1 (CET)
  - Summer (DST): UTC+2 (CEST)
- Postal code: 42-674
- Vehicle registration: STA
- Primary airport: Katowice Airport

Księży Las [ˈkɕɛ̃ʐɨ ˈlas] is a village in the administrative district of Gmina Zbrosławice, within Tarnowskie Góry County, Silesian Voivodeship, in southern Poland.
