= Hanusek =

- Village
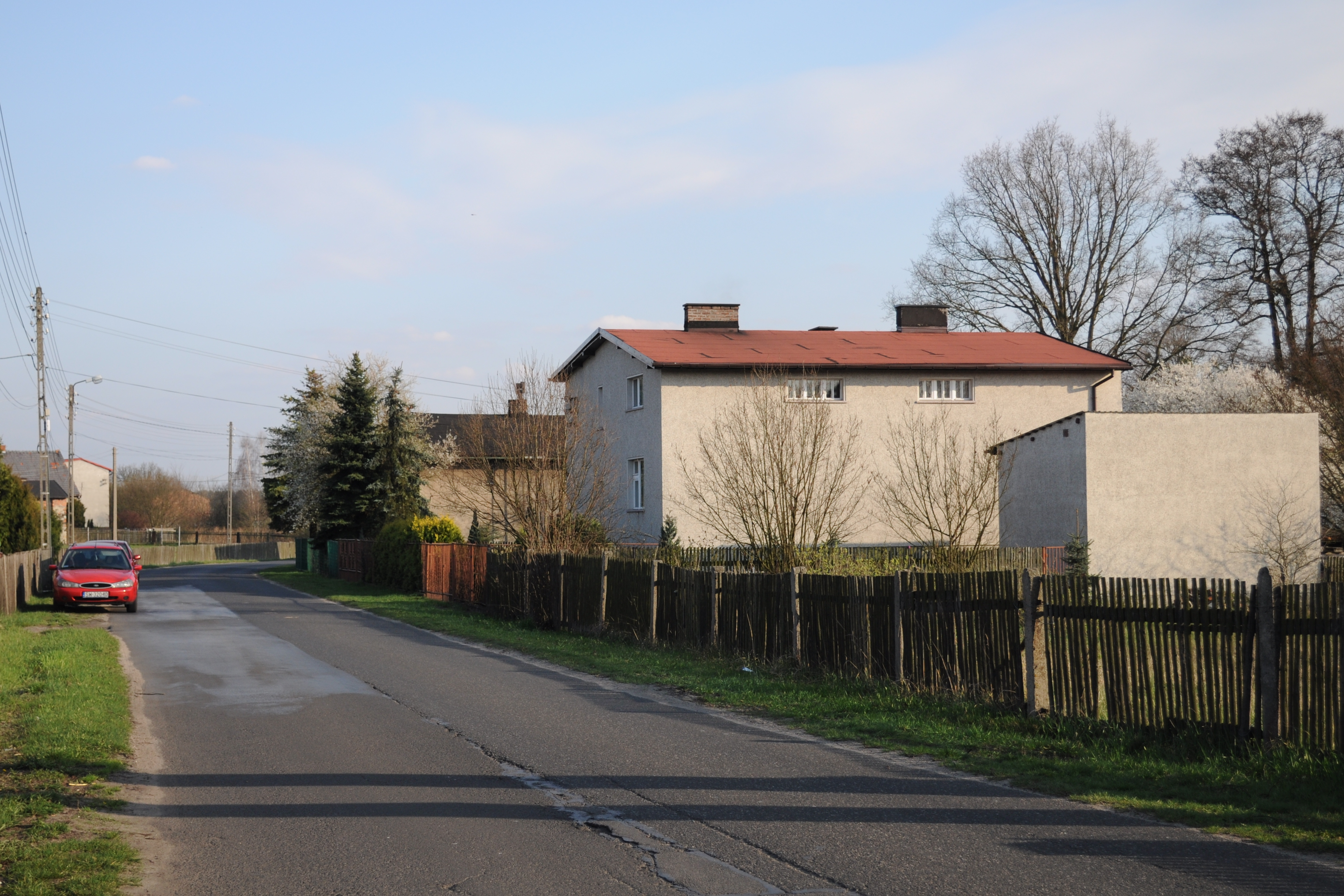

- Location within Poland
- Coordinates: 50°30′22″N 18°46′0″E
- Country: Poland
- Voivodeship: Silesian
- County: Tarnowskie Góry
- Gmina: Tworóg
- Website: www.boruszowicehanusek.yoyo.pl

Hanusek [xaˈnusɛk] is a village in the administrative district of Gmina Tworóg, within Tarnowskie Góry County, Silesian Voivodeship, in southern Poland.
