= Połomia, Tarnowskie Góry County =

Połomia
- Village
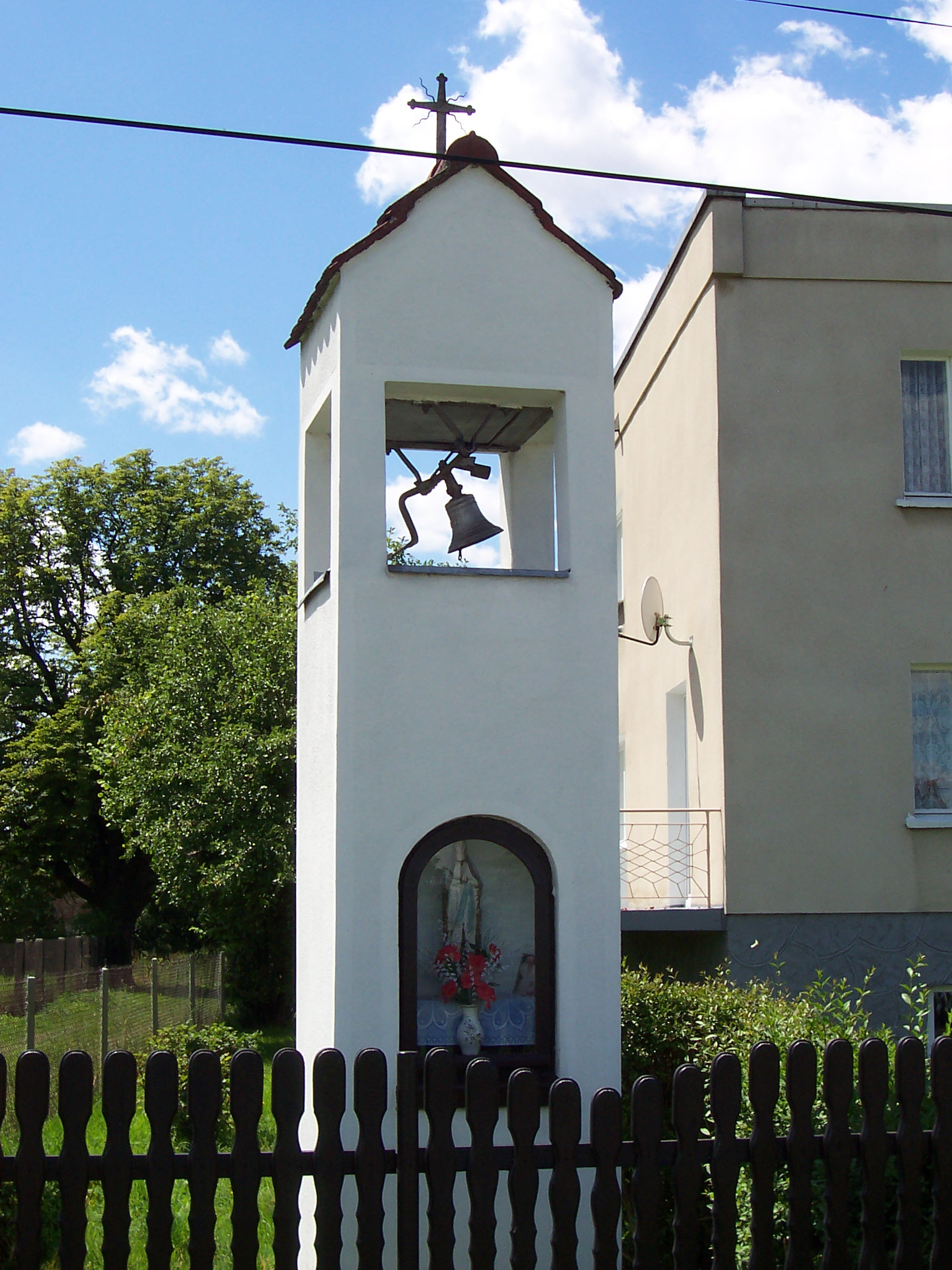
- Chapel

- Location within Poland
- Coordinates: 50°29′2″N 18°42′37″E
- Country: Poland
- Voivodeship: Silesian
- County: Tarnowskie Góry
- Gmina: Tworóg
- Elevation: 256 m (840 ft)
- Population: 450

Połomia [pɔˈwɔmja] is a village in the administrative district of Gmina Tworóg, within Tarnowskie Góry County, Silesian Voivodeship, in southern Poland.
