= Zawada, Tarnowskie Góry County =

Zawada
- Village
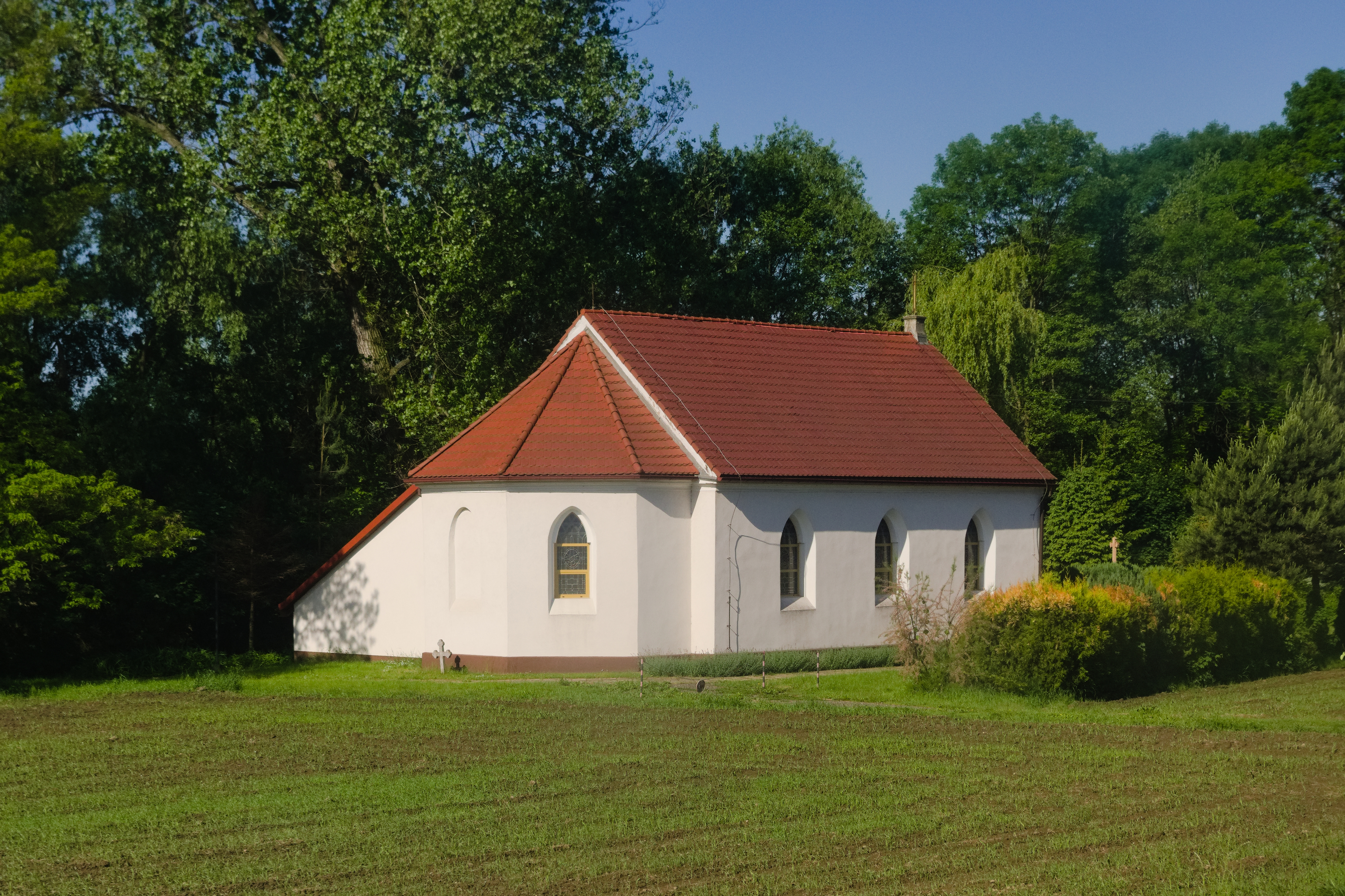
- Saint Mark church in Zawada

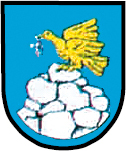
- Coat of arms

- Location within Poland
- Coordinates: 50°23′28″N 18°40′20″E
- Country: Poland
- Voivodeship: Silesian
- County: Tarnowskie Góry
- Gmina: Zbrosławice

Population
  - Total: 310
- Postal code: 42-674

Zawada [zaˈvada] is a village in the administrative district of Gmina Zbrosławice, within Tarnowskie Góry County, Silesian Voivodeship, in southern Poland.
