= Szałsza =

- Village
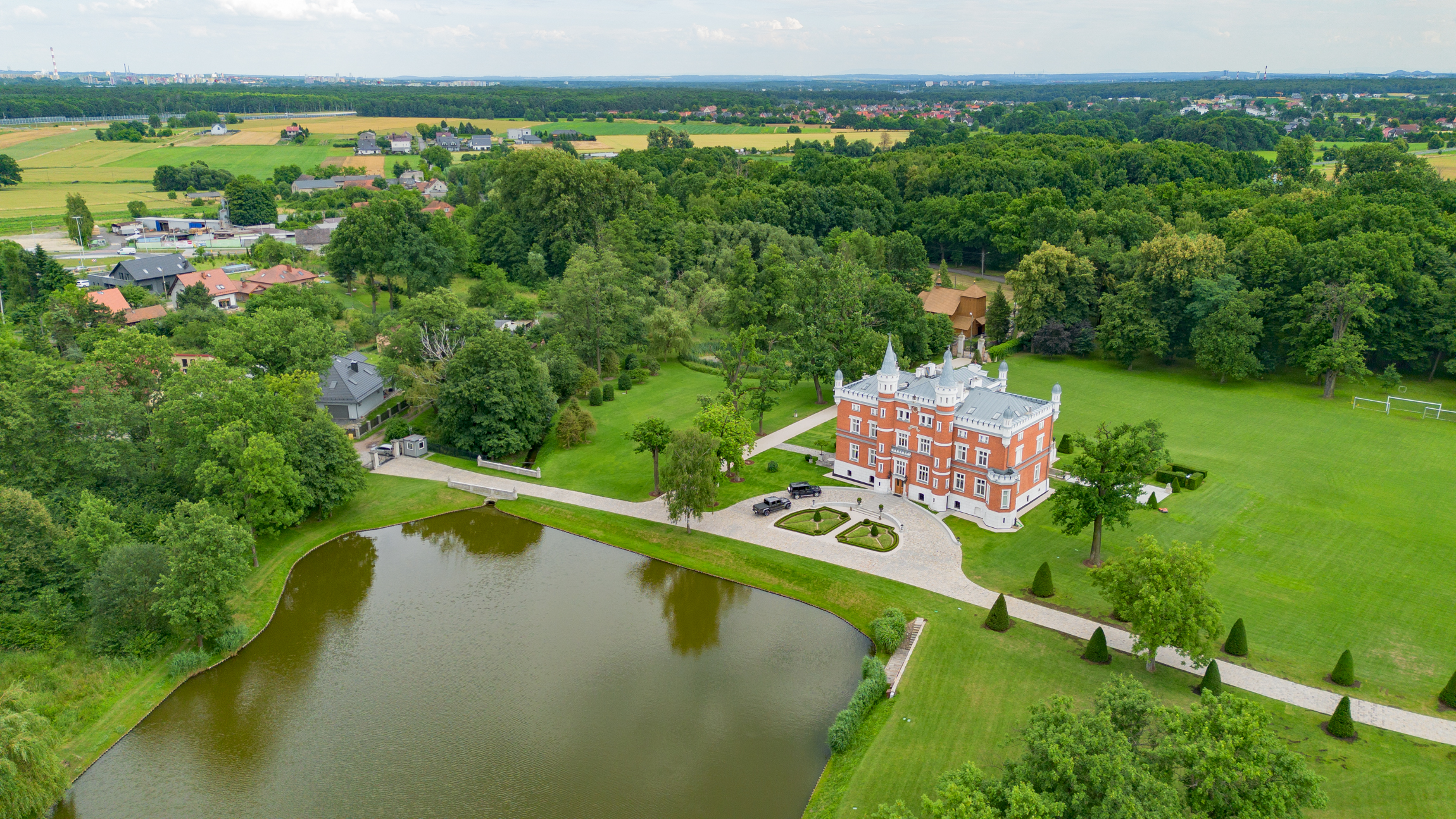

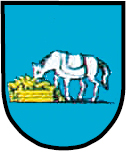
- Coat of arms

- Location within Poland
- Coordinates: 50°20′14″N 18°42′51″E
- Country: Poland
- Voivodeship: Silesian
- County: Tarnowskie Góry
- Gmina: Zbrosławice
- Population: 323

Szałsza [ˈʂau̯ʂa] is a village in the administrative district of Gmina Zbrosławice, within Tarnowskie Góry County, Silesian Voivodeship, in southern Poland.
