= Boniowice =

- Village
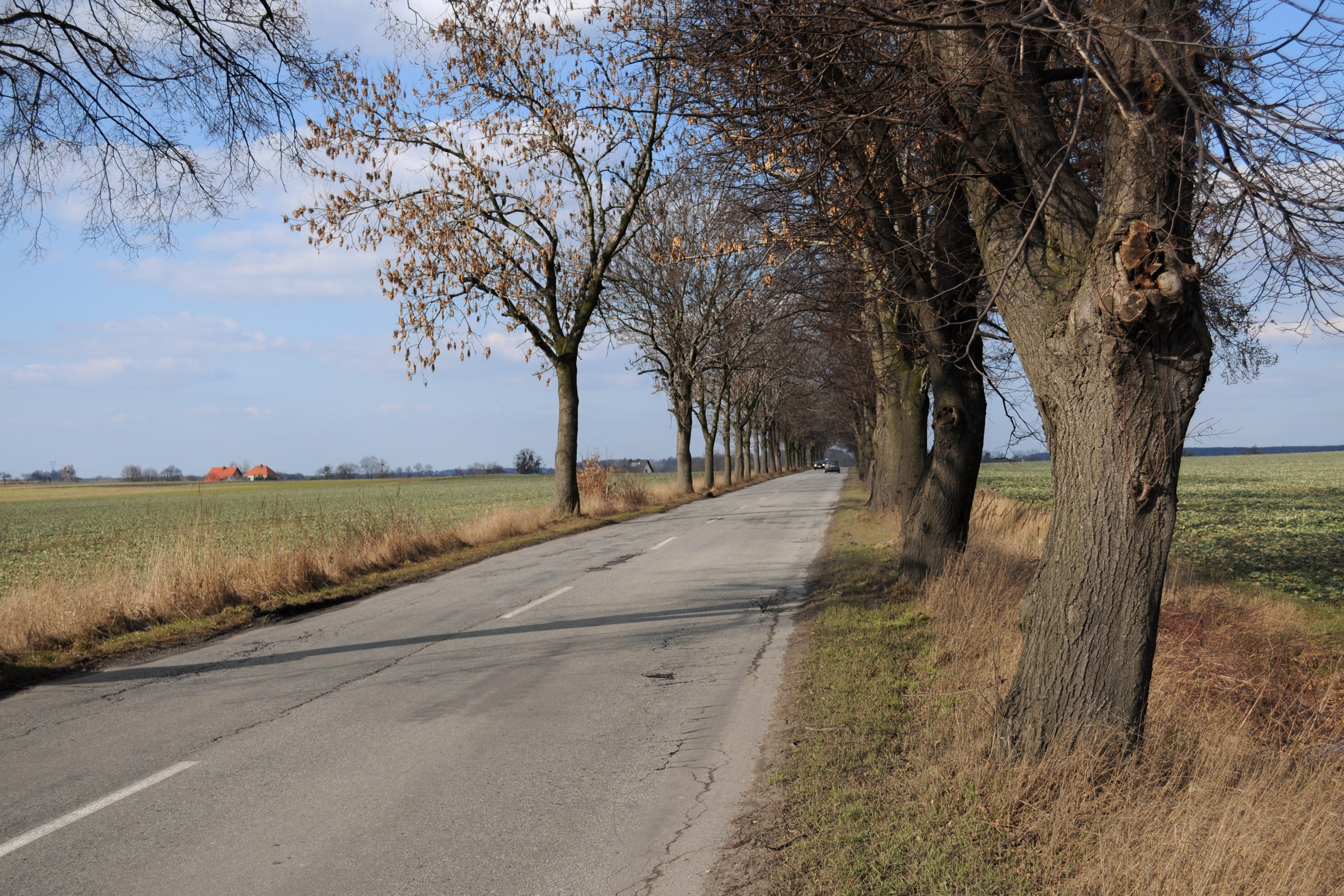

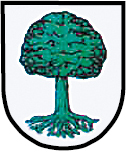
- Coat of arms

- Location within Poland
- Coordinates: 50°23′41″N 18°42′39″E
- Country: Poland
- Voivodeship: Silesian
- County: Tarnowskie Góry
- Gmina: Zbrosławice

Population
  - Total: 105
- Postal code: 42-674
- Vehicle registration: STA

Boniowice [bɔɲɔˈvit͡sɛ] is a village in the administrative district of Gmina Zbrosławice, within Tarnowskie Góry County, Silesian Voivodeship, in southern Poland.
