= Mikołeska =

- Village
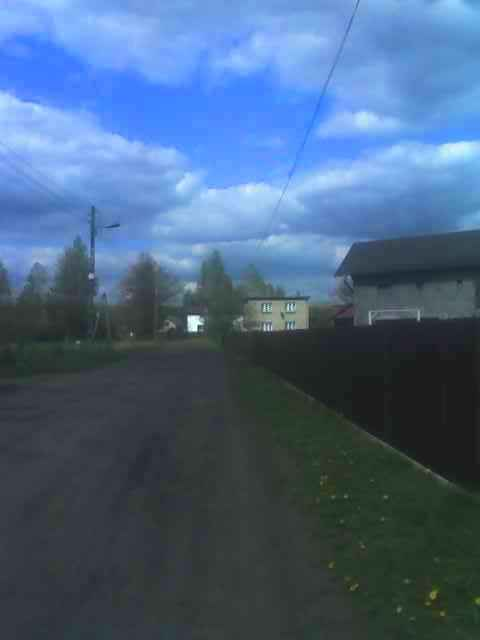

- Location within Poland
- Coordinates: 50°32′19″N 18°49′46″E
- Country: Poland
- Voivodeship: Silesian
- County: Tarnowskie Góry
- Gmina: Tworóg

Mikołeska [mikɔˈwɛska] is a village in the administrative district of Gmina Tworóg, within Tarnowskie Góry County, Silesian Voivodeship, in southern Poland.
