= Świętoszowice =

- Village
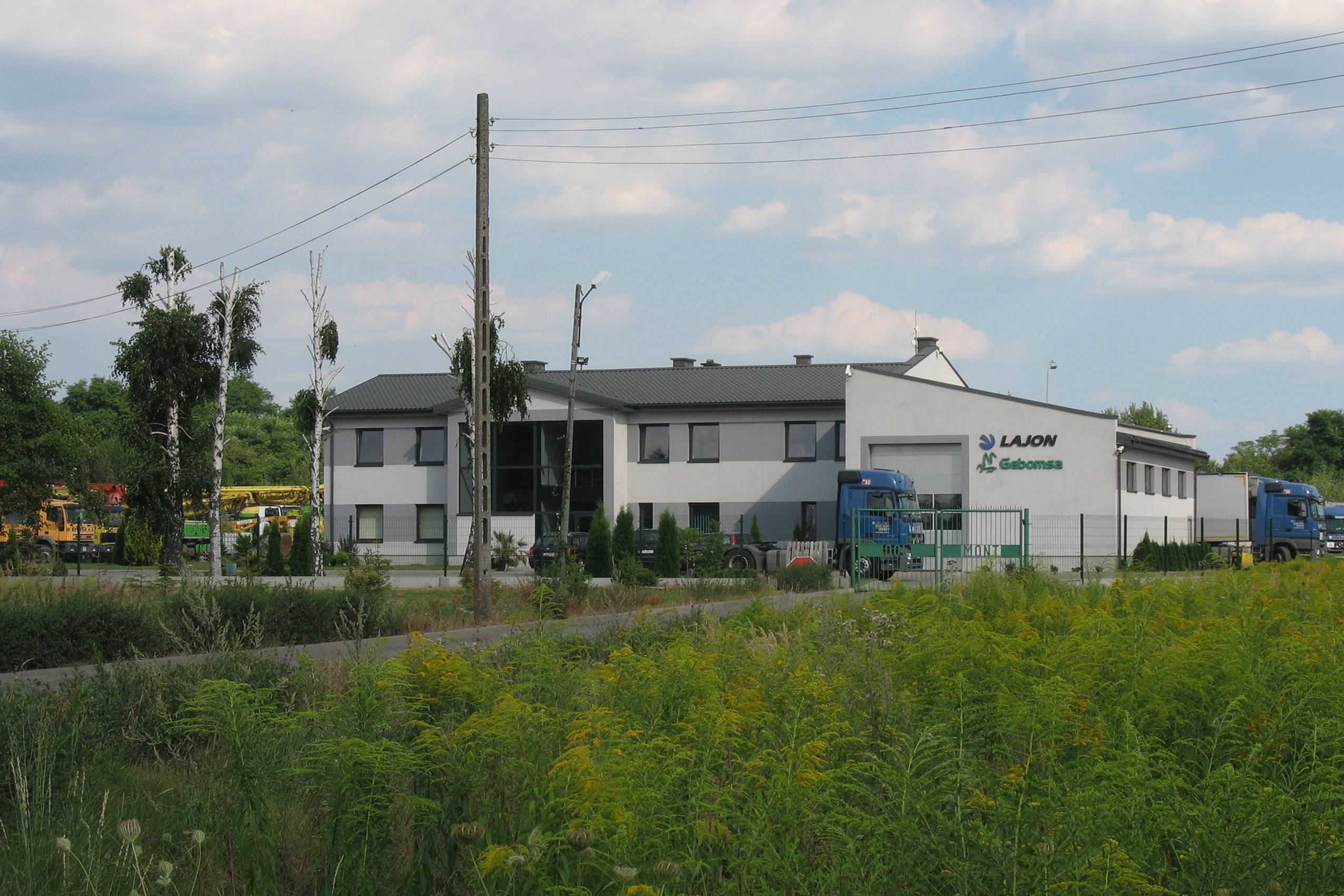

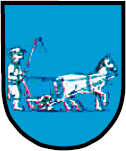
- Coat of arms

- Location within Poland
- Coordinates: 50°21′53″N 18°43′47″E
- Country: Poland
- Voivodeship: Silesian
- County: Tarnowskie Góry
- Gmina: Zbrosławice

Population
  - Total: 595

Świętoszowice (Polish: [ɕfjɛntɔʂɔˈvit͡sɛ]) is a village in the administrative district of Gmina Zbrosławice, within Tarnowskie Góry County, Silesian Voivodeship, in southern Poland.
