= Przezchlebie =

- Village
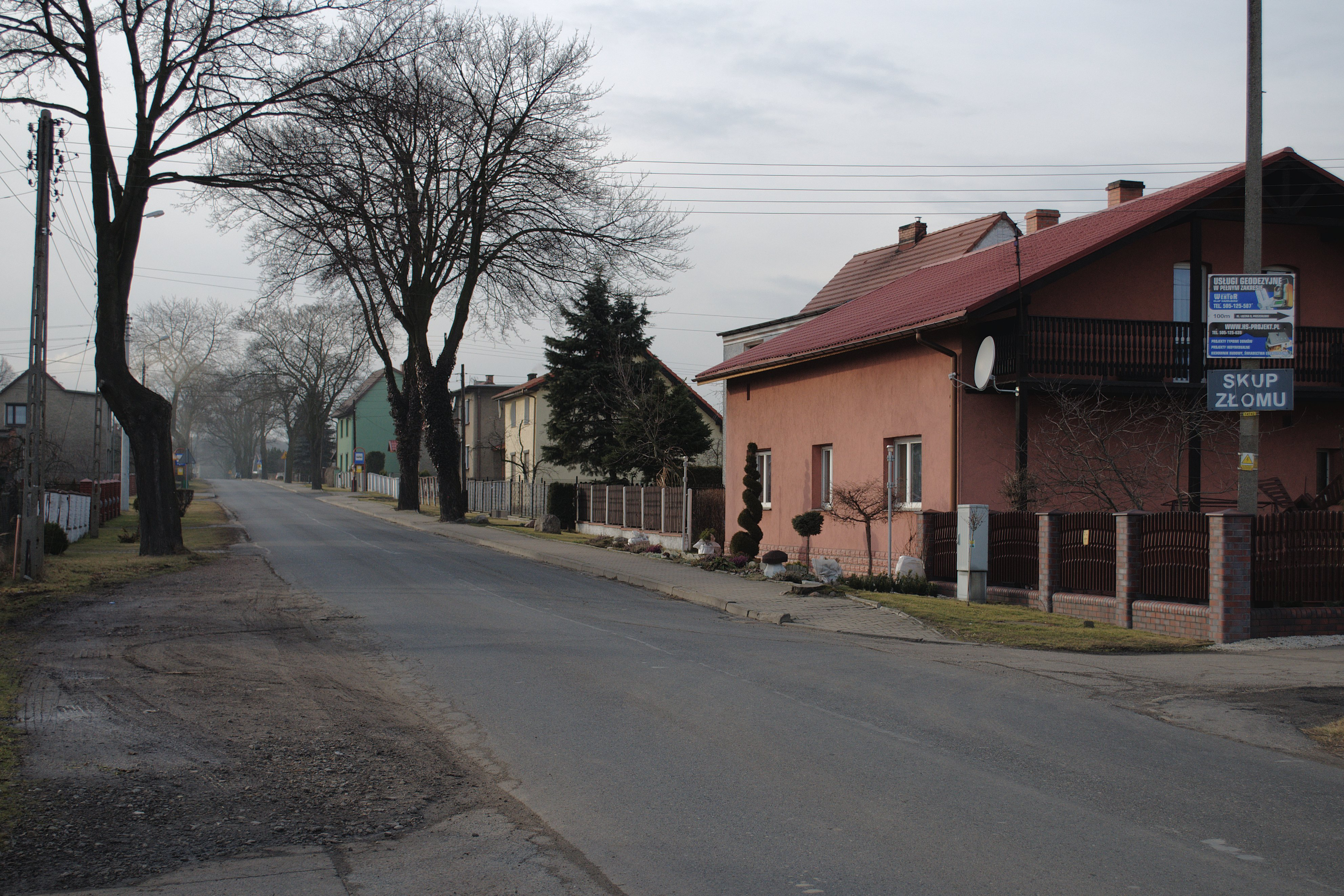

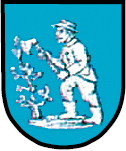
- Coat of arms

- Location within Poland
- Coordinates: 50°22′N 18°41′E
- Country: Poland
- Voivodeship: Silesian
- County: Tarnowskie Góry
- Gmina: Zbrosławice
- Population: 843

Przezchlebie [pʂɛsˈxlɛbjɛ] is a village in the administrative district of Gmina Zbrosławice, within Tarnowskie Góry County, Silesian Voivodeship, in southern Poland.
