= Kamieniec, Silesian Voivodeship =

Kamieniec
- Village
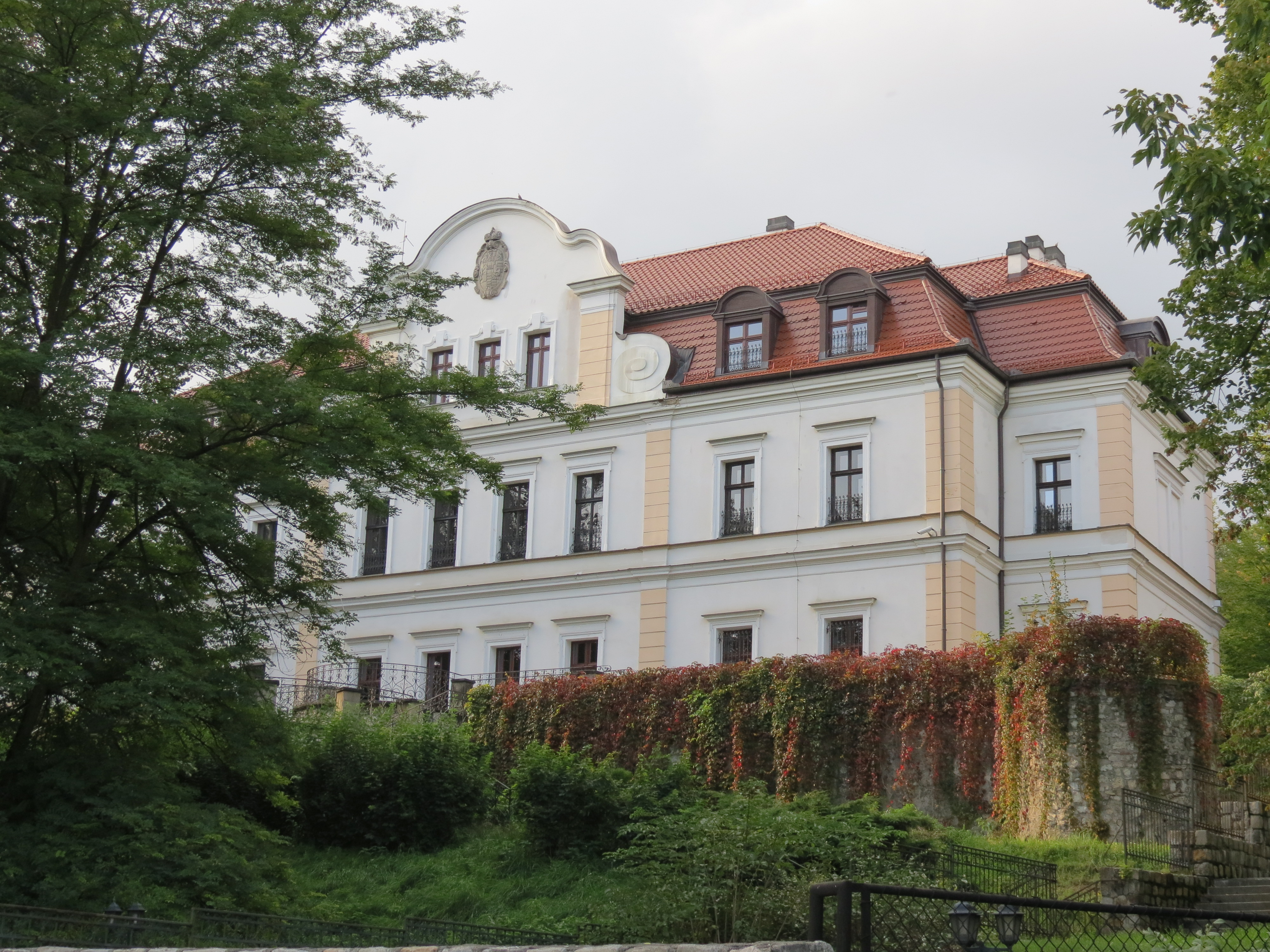
- Palace in Kamieniec

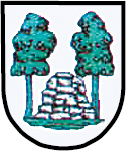
- Coat of arms

- Location within Poland
- Coordinates: 50°24′12″N 18°42′50″E
- Country: Poland
- Voivodeship: Silesian
- County: Tarnowskie Góry
- Gmina: Zbrosławice

Population
  - Total: 829
- Postal code: 42-674
- Vehicle registration: STA

Kamieniec [kaˈmjɛɲɛt͡s] is a village in the administrative district of Gmina Zbrosławice, within Tarnowskie Góry County, Silesian Voivodeship, in southern Poland.

The name of the village is of Polish origin and is derived from the word kamień, which means "stone".

Landmarks of Kamieniec are the Baroque palace, which now houses a Medical and Rehabilitation Center for Children, and the Gothic Church of the Birth of St John the Baptist.
