= Zbrosławice =

- Village
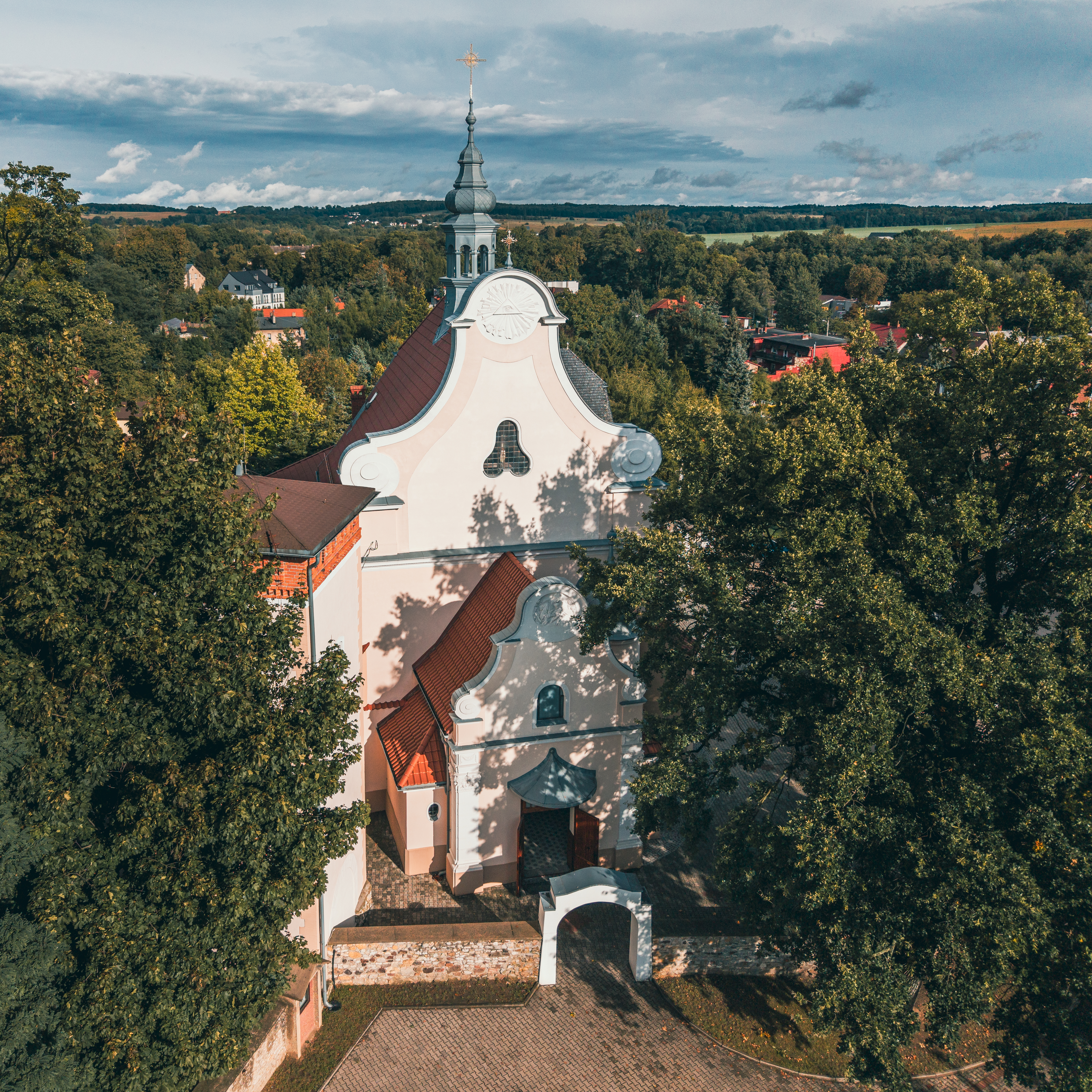
- Church of Assumption of the Blessed Virgin Mary

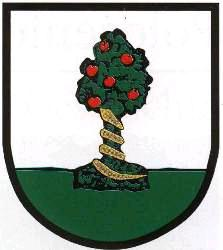
- Coat of arms

- Location within Poland
- Coordinates: 50°25′N 18°45′E
- Country: Poland
- Voivodeship: Silesian
- County: Tarnowskie Góry
- Gmina: Zbrosławice

Population
  - Total: 2,338
- Time zone: UTC+1 (CET)
  - Summer (DST): UTC+2 (CEST)
- Postal code: 42-674
- Vehicle registration: STA
- Primary airport: Katowice Airport
- Website: http://www.zbroslawice.pl/

Zbrosławice [zbrɔswaˈvit͡sɛ] is a village in Tarnowskie Góry County, Silesian Voivodeship, in southern Poland. It is the seat of the gmina (administrative district) called Gmina Zbrosławice.

== Notable people ==
The librarian Barbara Lison was born here in 1956.
