= Gmina Zbrosławice =

Gmina Zbrosławice Zbrosławice Commune
- Gmina
- Flag Coat of arms
- Interactive map of Gmina Zbrosławice
- Coordinates (Zbrosławice): 50°25′N 18°45′E
- Country: Poland
- Voivodeship: Silesian
- County: Tarnowskie Góry
- Seat: Zbrosławice

Area
  - Total: 148.71 km^{2} (57.42 sq mi)

Population (2019-06-30)
  - Total: 16,184
  - Density: 108.83/km^{2} (281.87/sq mi)
- Website: http://www.zbroslawice.pl/

Gmina Zbrosławice is a rural gmina (administrative district) in Tarnowskie Góry County, Silesian Voivodeship, in southern Poland. Its seat is the village of Zbrosławice (germ. Broslawitz), which lies approximately 10 kilometres (6 mi) south-west of Tarnowskie Góry and 26 km (16 mi) north-west of the regional capital Katowice.

The gmina covers an area of 148.71 square kilometres (57.4 sq mi), and as of 2019, its total population was 16,184.

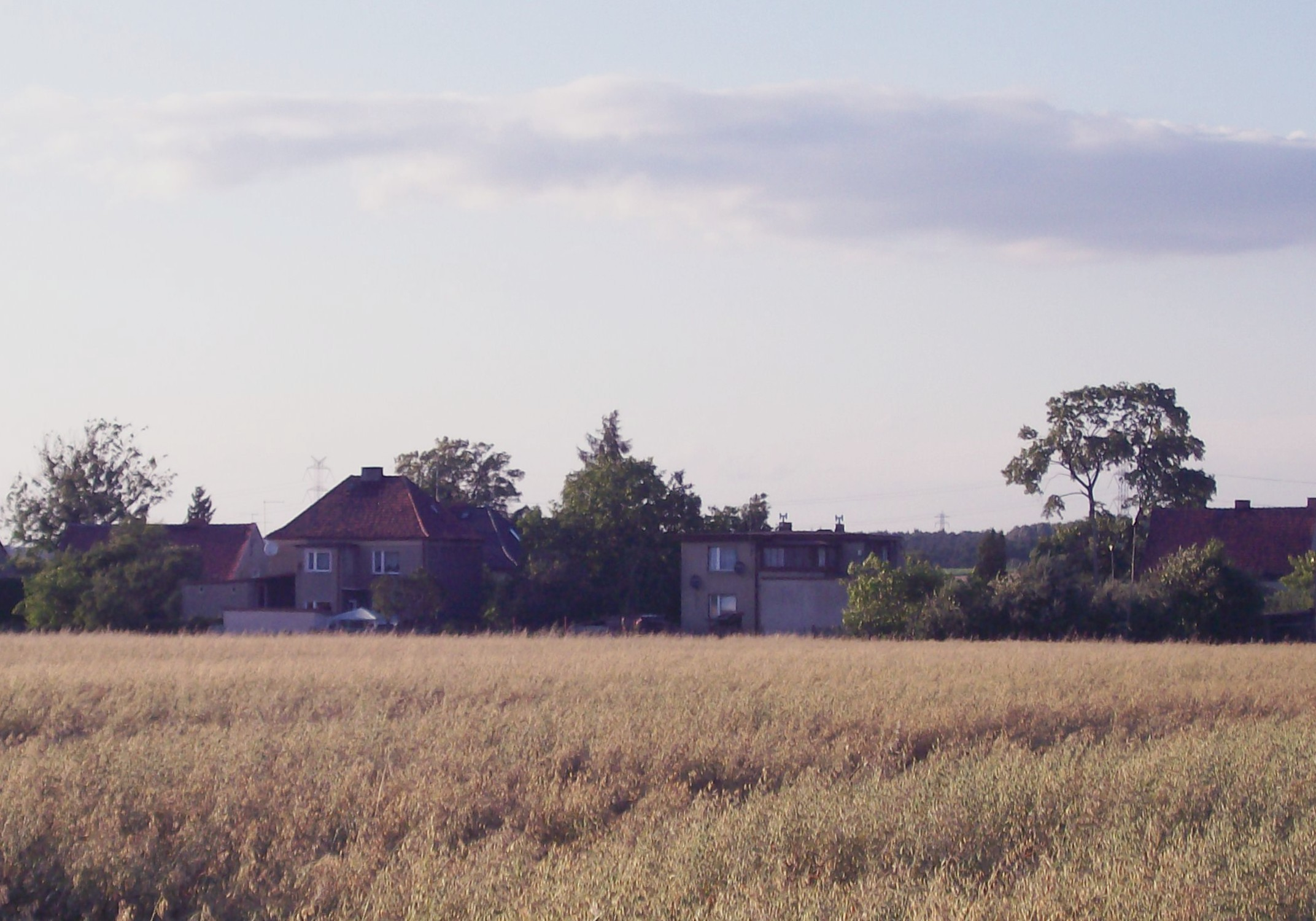

== Villages ==
Gmina Zbrosławice contains the villages and settlements of Boniowice, Czekanów, Jasiona, Jaśkowice, Kamieniec, Karchowice, Kopienica, Księży Las, Laryszów, Łubie, Łubki, Miedary, Przezchlebie, Ptakowice, Świętoszowice, Szałsza, Wieszowa, Wilkowice, Zawada, Zbrosławice and Ziemięcice.

== Neighbouring gminas ==
Gmina Zbrosławice is bordered by the towns of Bytom, Gliwice, Pyskowice, Tarnowskie Góry and Zabrze, and by the gminas of Toszek, Tworóg and Wielowieś.

== Twin towns – sister cities ==
Gmina Zbrosławice is twinned with:

- Brackenheim, Germany
- Castagnole delle Lanze, Italy
- Charnay-lès-Mâcon, France
- Tarnalelesz, Hungary
