= Kalety =

Town in Silesian Voivodeship, Poland

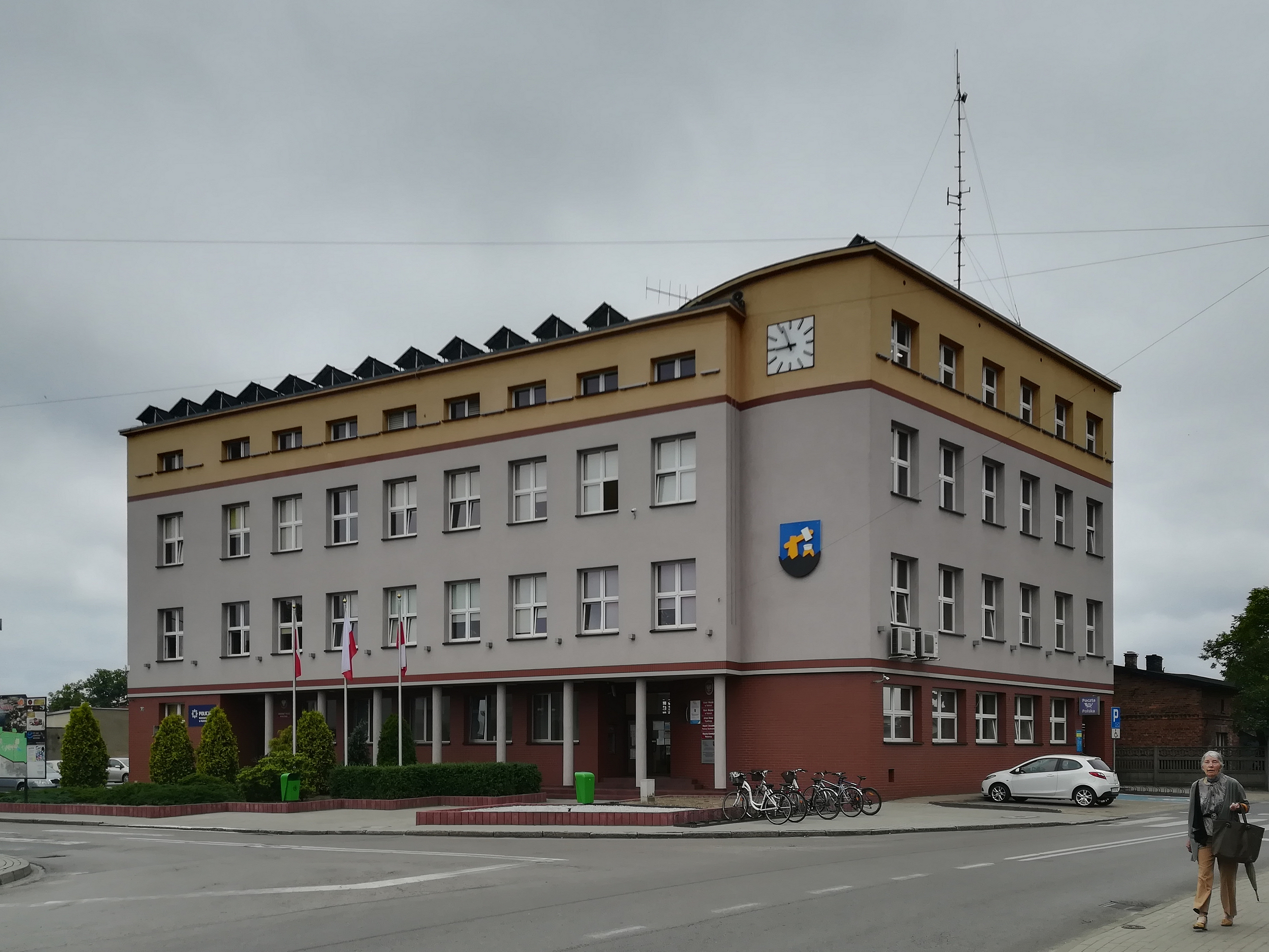
- Town hall

- Coat of arms

- Location within Poland
- Coordinates: 50°34′N 18°54′E
- Country: Poland
- Voivodeship: Silesian
- County: Tarnowskie Góry
- Gmina: Kalety (urban gmina)

Area
  - Total: 57.68 km^{2} (22.27 sq mi)

Population (2019-06-30)
  - Total: 8,607
  - Density: 149.2/km^{2} (386.5/sq mi)
- Time zone: UTC+1 (CET)
  - Summer (DST): UTC+2 (CEST)
- Postal code: 42-660
- Vehicle registration: STA
- Website: http://www.kalety.pl

Kalety ([kaˈlɛtɨ] kə-LET-ee, Silesian: Kalyty, [kaˈlɨtɨ] kə-LEET-ee) is a town in Tarnowskie Góry County, Silesian Voivodeship, in southern Poland, with 8,607 inhabitants as of 2019.

Kalety is a member of Cittaslow.

== History ==
During World War II, six people from Kalety, including five policemen, were murdered by the Russians in the Katyn massacre in 1940.

== Demographics ==
Historical population
Year	Pop.	±%
1950	6,699	—
1960	6,653	−0.7%
2010	8,681	+30.5%

== Twin towns – sister cities ==
Kalety is twinned with:

- Ustroń, Poland
- Vítkov, Czech Republic
