= Tworóg =

- Village
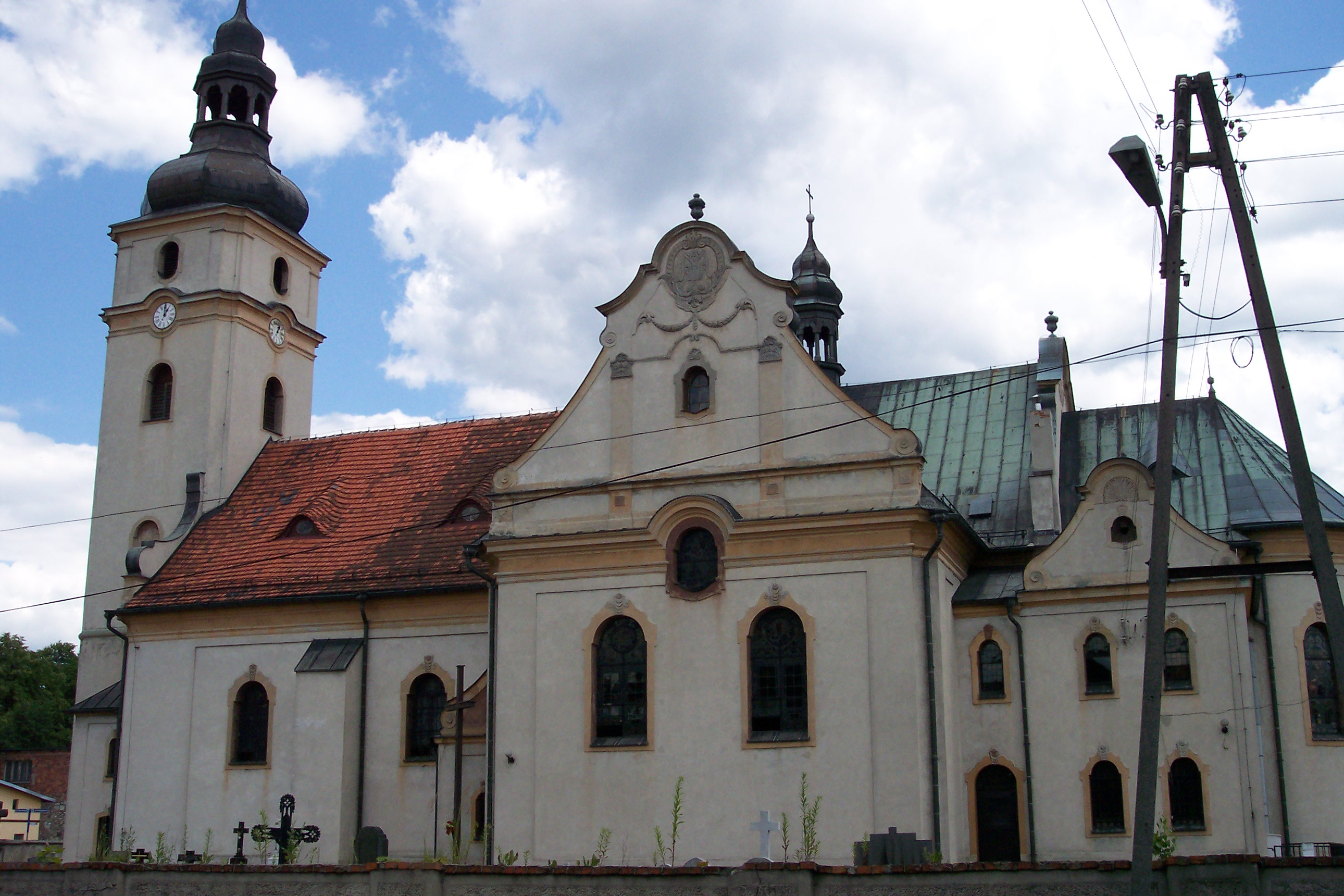
- Saint Anthony Church

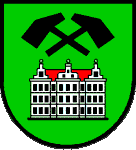
- Coat of arms

- Location within Poland
- Coordinates: 50°32′N 18°42′E
- Country: Poland
- Voivodeship: Silesian
- County: Tarnowskie Góry
- Gmina: Tworóg
- Population: 3,500
- Website: http://www.tworog.pl/

Tworóg [ˈtfɔruk] is a village in Tarnowskie Góry County, Silesian Voivodeship, in southern Poland. It is the seat of the gmina (administrative district) called Gmina Tworóg.
