= Gmina Tworóg =

Gmina Tworóg Tworóg Commune
- Gmina
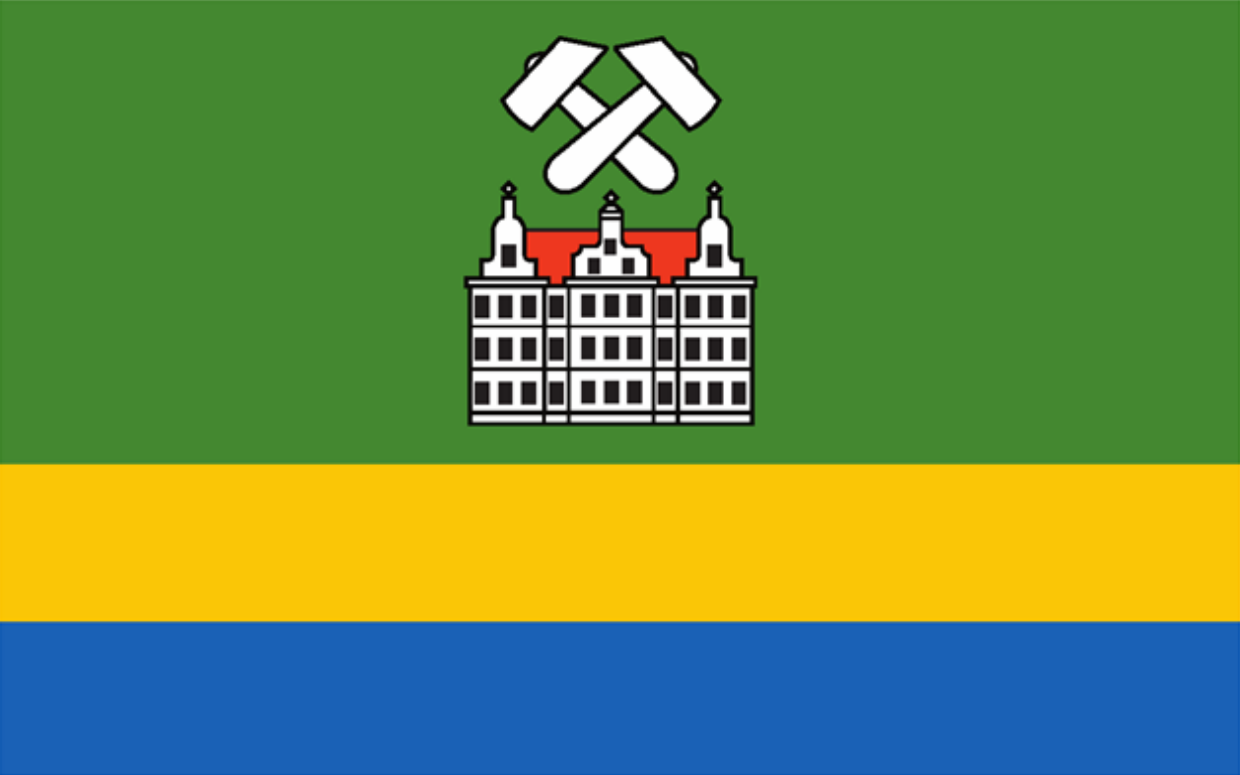
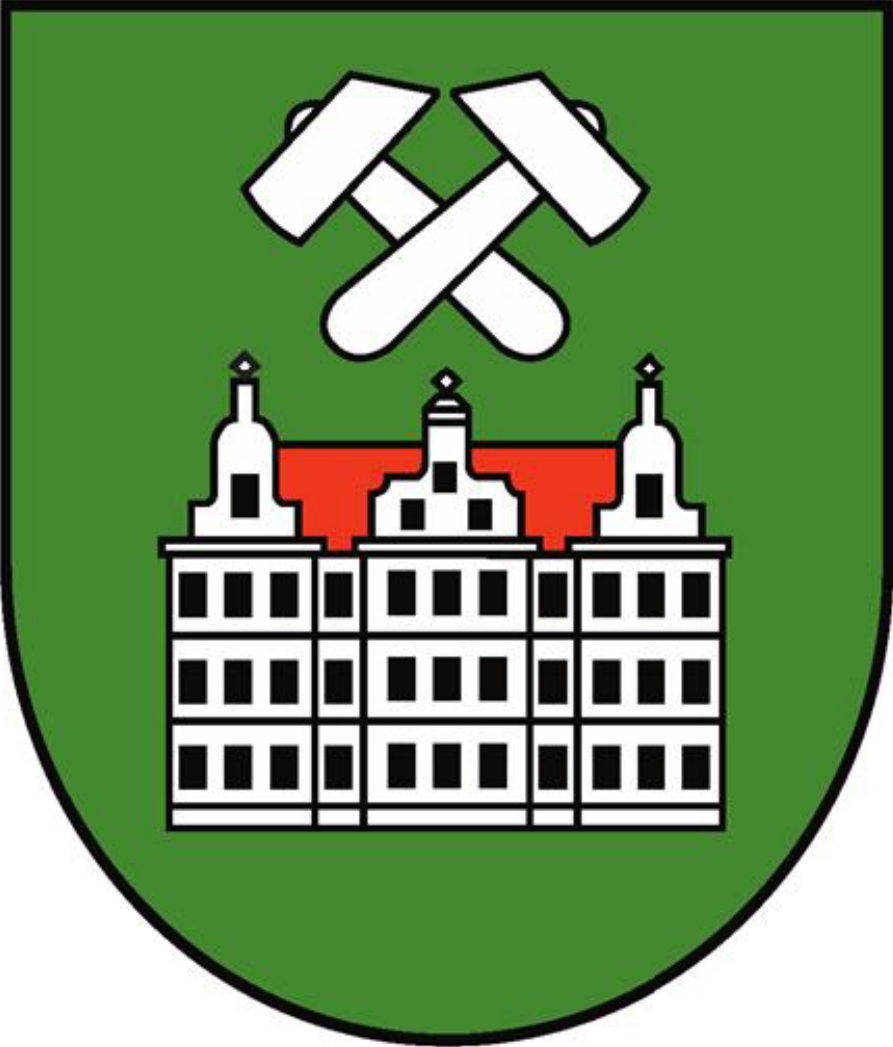
- Flag Coat of arms
- Interactive map of Gmina Tworóg
- Coordinates (Tworóg): 50°32′N 18°42′E
- Country: Poland
- Voivodeship: Silesian
- County: Tarnowskie Góry
- Seat: Tworóg

Area
  - Total: 124.92 km^{2} (48.23 sq mi)

Population (2019-06-30)
  - Total: 8,249
  - Density: 66.03/km^{2} (171.0/sq mi)
- Website: https://www.tworog.pl/

Gmina Tworóg is a rural gmina (administrative district) in Tarnowskie Góry County, Silesian Voivodeship, in southern Poland. Its seat is the village of Tworóg, which lies approximately 15 kilometres (9 mi) north-west of Tarnowskie Góry and 38 km (24 mi) north-west of the regional capital Katowice.

The gmina covers an area of 124.92 square kilometres (48.2 sq mi) and had a total population of 8,249 in 2019.

== Villages ==
Gmina Tworóg contains the villages and settlements of Boruszowice, Brynek, Hanusek, Koty, Mikołeska, Nowa Wieś Tworoska, Połomia, Świniowice, Tworóg and Wojska.

== Neighbouring gminas ==
Gmina Tworóg is bordered by the towns of Lubliniec and Tarnowskie Góry, and by the gminas of Koszęcin, Krupski Młyn, Wielowieś and Zbrosławice.
