= Miasteczko Śląskie =

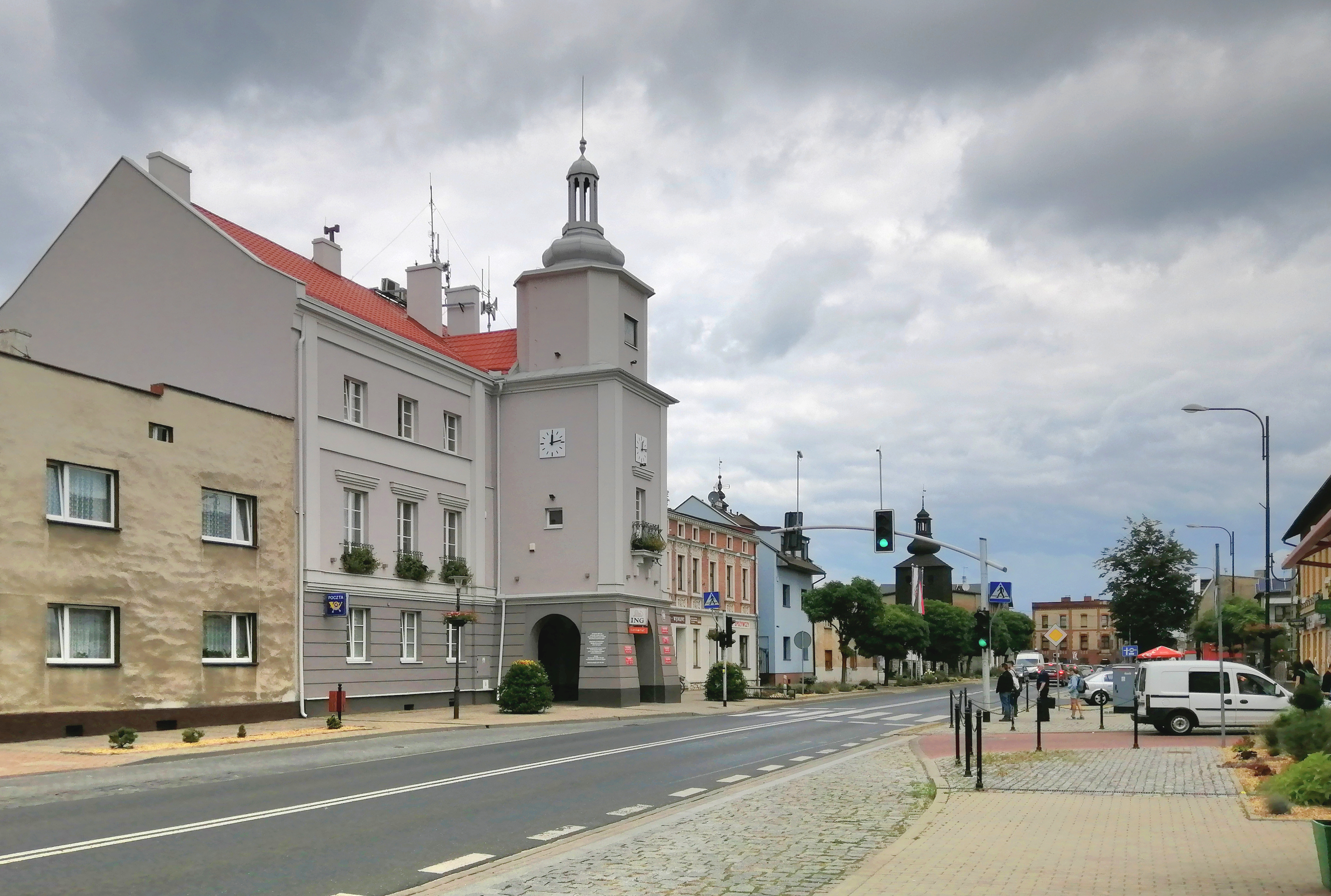
- Town square

- Coat of arms

- Location within Poland
- Coordinates: 50°29′N 18°54′E
- Country: Poland
- Voivodeship: Silesian
- County: Tarnowskie Góry
- Gmina: Miasteczko Śląskie (urban gmina)
- Established: 16th century
- Town rights: 1561

Government
  - Mayor: Michał Skrzydło

Area
  - Total: 67.94 km^{2} (26.23 sq mi)

Population (2022-01-01)
  - Total: 7,044
  - Density: 103.7/km^{2} (268.5/sq mi)
- Time zone: UTC+1 (CET)
  - Summer (DST): UTC+2 (CEST)
- Postal code: 40-001 to 40-999
- Area code: +48 32
- Car plates: STA
- Website: http://www.miasteczko-slaskie.pl

Miasteczko Śląskie [mʲasˈtɛt͡ʂkɔ ˈɕlɔ̃skʲɛ] (the name means "Silesian Small Town" or "Silesian Little Town"; originally Żyglińskie Góry; formerly also Miasteczko; German: Georgenberg) is a town in Upper Silesia in southern Poland, near Katowice. It borders the Metropolis GZM - a large metropolitan area with a population of over 2 million. It is located in the Silesian Highlands.

It is situated in the Silesian Voivodeship since its formation in 1999, previously in Katowice Voivodeship, and before World War II, in the Autonomous Silesian Voivodeship. Miasteczko Śląskie is one of the towns within the Katowice urban area and within the greater Katowice-Ostrava metropolitan area with a population of about 5,294,000 people. The population of the town is 7,437 (2019).

The settlement was founded between 1526 and 1543. In 1561, it was granted town rights.

== Industry ==
The largest factory in the town is the Miasteczko Śląskie Zinc Smelter. This metallurgical plant was originally built under license for the British company Imperial Smelting Processes of Bristol. Now a modern plant, ore processing is carried out in a continuous process, producing both zinc and lead. The complex comprises: a sintering plant, a sulphuric acid plant, a rotary furnace, and a lead refinery.

During the 1970s and 1980s, the smelter was a major source of atmospheric emissions of lead and other heavy metals in the northern part of the Katowice Voivodeship. In the early 1990s, several sections of the plant were closed, and modern abatement equipment was installed on the sections left working. This led to the net reduction of heavy metal emissions to air.
