= Tarnowskie Góry County =

Tarnowskie Góry County Powiat tarnogórski
- County
- Flag Coat of arms

- Location within the voivodeship

- Location in Poland
- Coordinates (Tarnowskie Góry): 50°27′N 18°52′E
- Country: Poland
- Voivodeship: Silesian
- Seat: Tarnowskie Góry
- Gminas: Total 9 (incl. 4 urban): Kalety; Miasteczko Śląskie; Radzionków; Tarnowskie Góry; Gmina Krupski Młyn; Gmina Ożarowice; Gmina Świerklaniec; Gmina Tworóg; Gmina Zbrosławice

Government
  - Starosta: Krystyna Kosmala

Area
  - Total: 642.63 km^{2} (248.12 sq mi)

Population (2019-06-30)
  - Total: 140,022
  - Density: 217.89/km^{2} (564.33/sq mi)
  - Urban: 94,292
  - Rural: 45,730
- Car plates: STA
- Website: www.powiat.tarnogorski.pl

Tarnowskie Góry County (Polish: powiat tarnogórski) is a unit of territorial administration and local government (powiat) in Silesian Voivodeship, southern Poland. It came into being on January 1, 1999, as a result of the Polish local government reforms passed in 1998. Its administrative seat and largest town is Tarnowskie Góry, which lies 25 kilometres (16 mi) north-west of the regional capital Katowice. The county contains three other towns: Radzionków, 8 km (5 mi) south of Tarnowskie Góry, Kalety, 14 km (9 mi) north of Tarnowskie Góry, and Miasteczko Śląskie, 5 km (3 mi) north-east of Tarnowskie Góry.

The county covers an area of 642.63 square kilometres (248.1 sq mi). As of 2019 its total population is 140,022, out of which the population of Tarnowskie Góry is 61,422, that of Radzionków is 16,826, that of Kalety is 8,607, that of Miasteczko Śląskie is 7,437, and the rural population is 45,730.

== Neighbouring counties ==
Tarnowskie Góry County is bordered by Lubliniec County to the north, Myszków County to the east, Będzin County and the city of Piekary Śląskie to the south-east, the cities of Bytom and Zabrze to the south, the city of Gliwice and Gliwice County to the south-west, and Strzelce County to the west.

== Administrative divisions ==
Subdivisions of Tarnowskie Góry County

The county is subdivided into nine gminas (four urban and five rural). These are listed in the following table, in descending order of population.

Gmina	Type	Area (km^{2})	Population (2019)	Seat
Tarnowskie Góry	urban	83.5	61,422	
Radzionków	urban	13.3	16,826	
Gmina Zbrosławice	rural	148.7	16,184	Zbrosławice
Gmina Świerklaniec	rural	44.3	12,328	Świerklaniec
Kalety	urban	57.7	8,607	
Gmina Tworóg	rural	124.9	8,249	Tworóg
Miasteczko Śląskie	urban	68.3	7,437	
Gmina Ożarowice	rural	43.7	5,794	Ożarowice
Gmina Krupski Młyn	rural	39.4	3,175	Krupski Młyn
