= Youth Spring in Tarnowskie Góry =

Karst spring with a chapel in Tarnowskie Góry, Poland

Youth Spring
- Źródło Młodości (Polish)
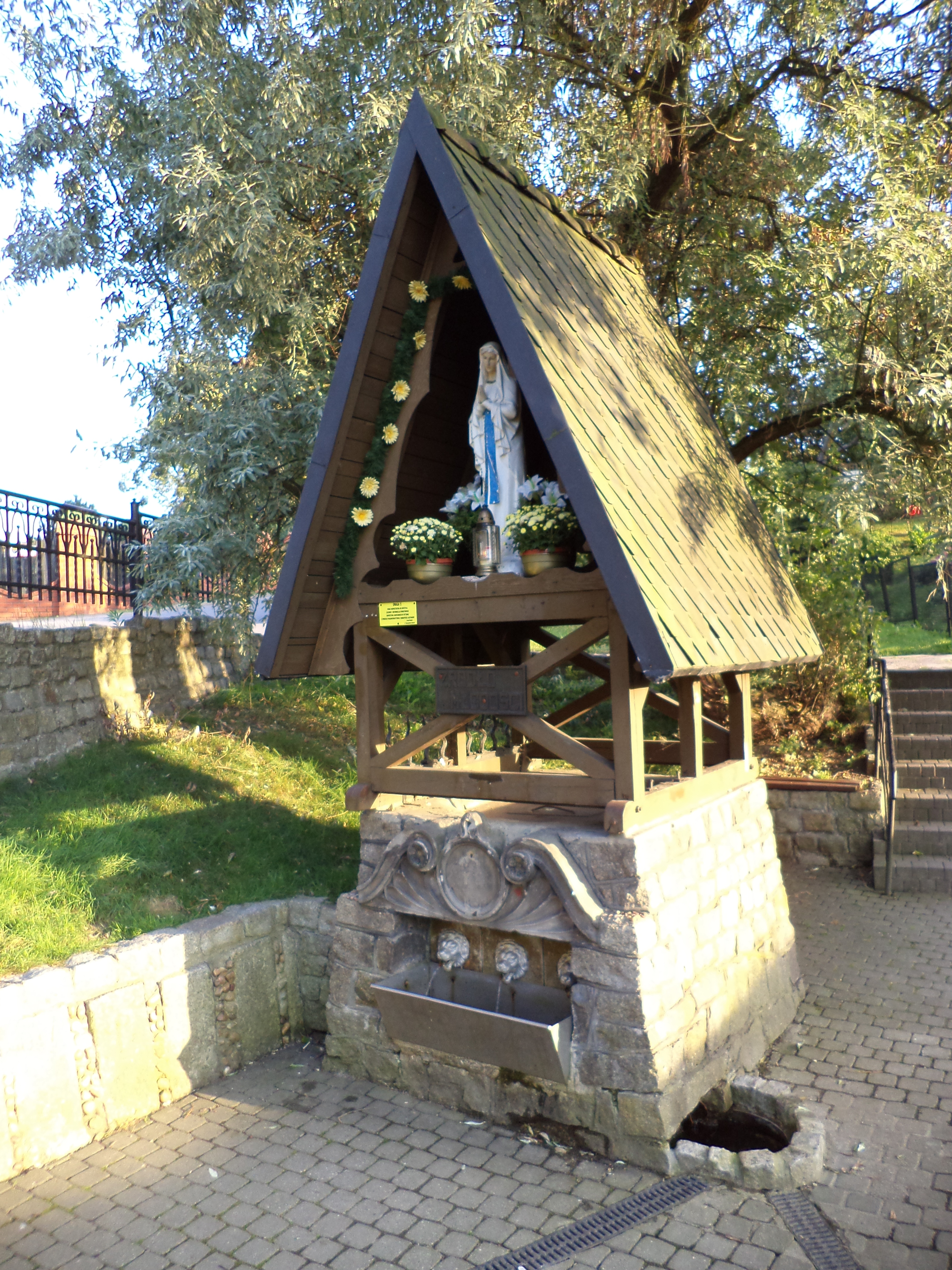
- Decorative structure of the Youth Spring (2015)
- Location: Tarnowskie Góry (Repty Śląskie), Poland
- Coordinates: 50°25′12.0″N 18°49′02.8″E
- Type: Karst spring

The Youth Spring (Polish: Źródło Młodości), also known as Źródełko Młodości, is a karst spring with a decorative structure resembling a historic shrine and a specially designed surrounding area.

== Location ==
The spring emerges on Tarnowskie Góry Ridge in Repty Śląskie, a district of Tarnowskie Góry. It flows into the Drama river through the Repty Ditch, one of the river's source tributaries.

The spring is located in the southwestern part of Tarnowskie Góry, in the Repty Śląskie district, at the intersection of 15 Henryk Renek Street and Jan Waliska Street. Nearby runs Wincenty Witos Street, a county road (no. 3221S) in Tarnowskie Góry County. Adjacent to the monument is the final bus stop, Repty Śląskie Witosa, served by bus line 289, connecting to the city center.

== History and features ==
According to local accounts, water from dolomite rocks has been emerging at this site since "time immemorial". The origin of the spring's name is unclear, but its waters are known for their taste, attracting residents from nearby areas. Originally, the spring was a simple outflow of groundwater, forming one of the source streams of the Drama river. In 1969, the newly established Repty branch of the Tarnowskie Góry Enthusiasts Association began efforts to restore and enhance the spring and its surroundings. The project was completed in 1974. The spring's structure was built using boundary markers from the Polish-German border of the interwar period and stonework fragments from the dismantled Repty Palace of Kraft Henckel von Donnersmarck. The water outflow was partially channeled through three lion-head-shaped faucets.

In 1999, renovation work paved the area around the spring, replaced the roofing, and added new benches. Beyond its function as a spring, the site also became a shrine. On 31 May 1999, a statue of Our Lady of the Poor, brought by the Wojtas family from the Banneux sanctuary in the Ardennes, Belgium, was placed in the shrine.

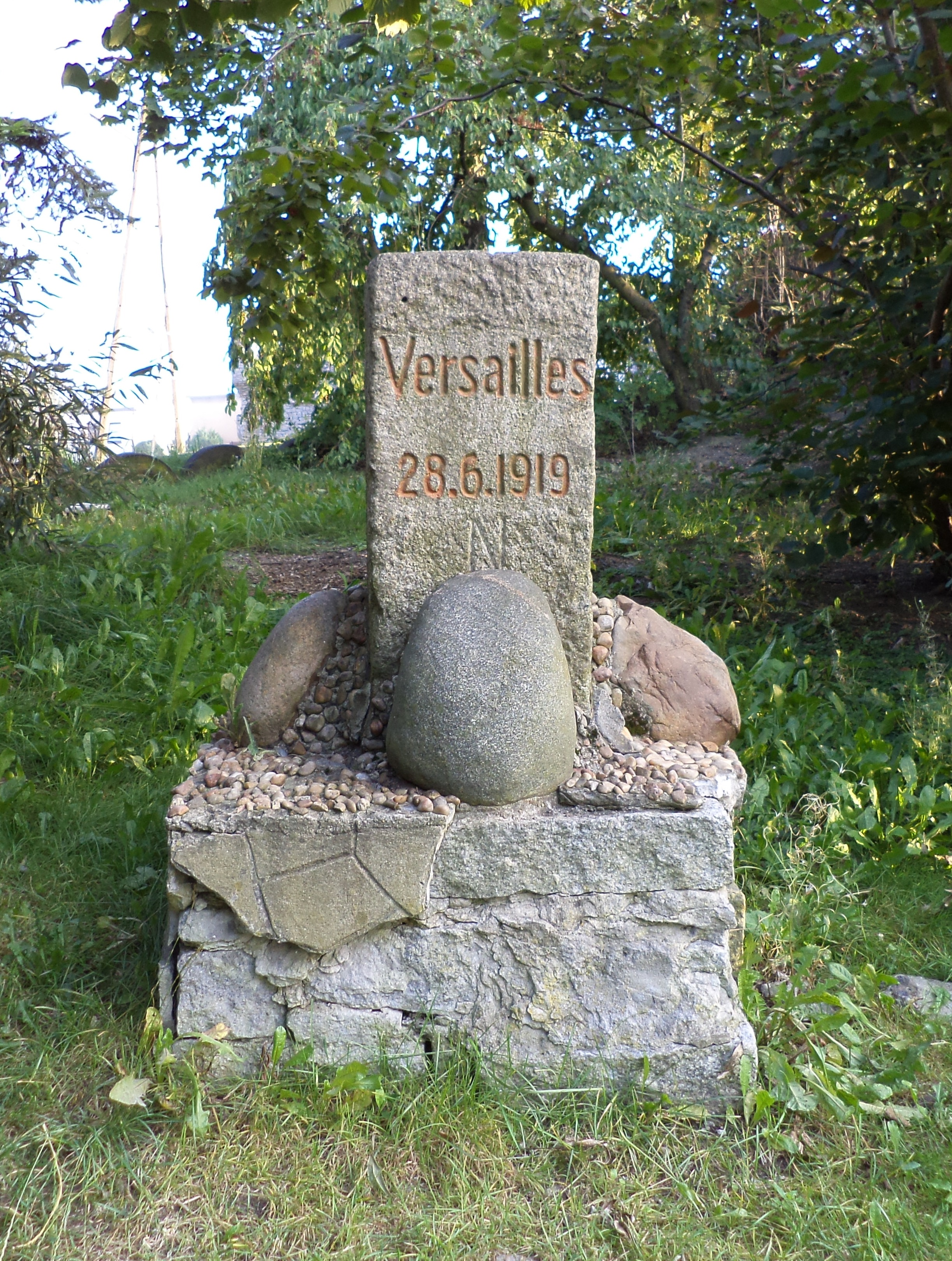
Boundary marker in Repty Śląskie

The Youth Spring is one of only two active springs in the southern part of Tarnowskie Góry, alongside Paulsborn in Lasowice Colony. Most other springs in the area have dried up due to the lowering of groundwater levels caused by the operations of the Black Trout Adit. The spring is part of a local system of infiltrating rainwater circulation, with a flow rate of 0.8 dm³/s. The water contains low levels of calcium but exceeds permissible nitrate levels, primarily due to contamination from nearby fields, making it unsuitable for drinking.

Near the spring stands a monument – a boundary marker from the interwar period placed on a small stone socle. The granite pillar is inscribed with "Versailles 28.6.1919", referring to the Treaty of Versailles, and the letters P and D, representing Poland and Germany (Deutschland). Like the stones used in the spring's structure, it originates from the former Polish-German border, likely from the section between Repty and Stolarzowice or Ptakowice.

Both the spring, with its structure and shrine containing the statue of Our Lady of the Poor, and the nearby monument are listed in the municipal register of monuments of Tarnowskie Góry.

Nearby, the Polish Hussars Trail and the Silesian Uprisings Trail pass through.

On 4 December 2019, during the Barbórka celebrations, a miner's sculpture, a replica of a work by folk artist Alojzy Niedbała from Bobrowniki, Tarnowskie Góry, was unveiled near the Youth Spring. In 2022, the Youth Spring underwent another comprehensive renovation.
