= Drama (river) =

River in Poland

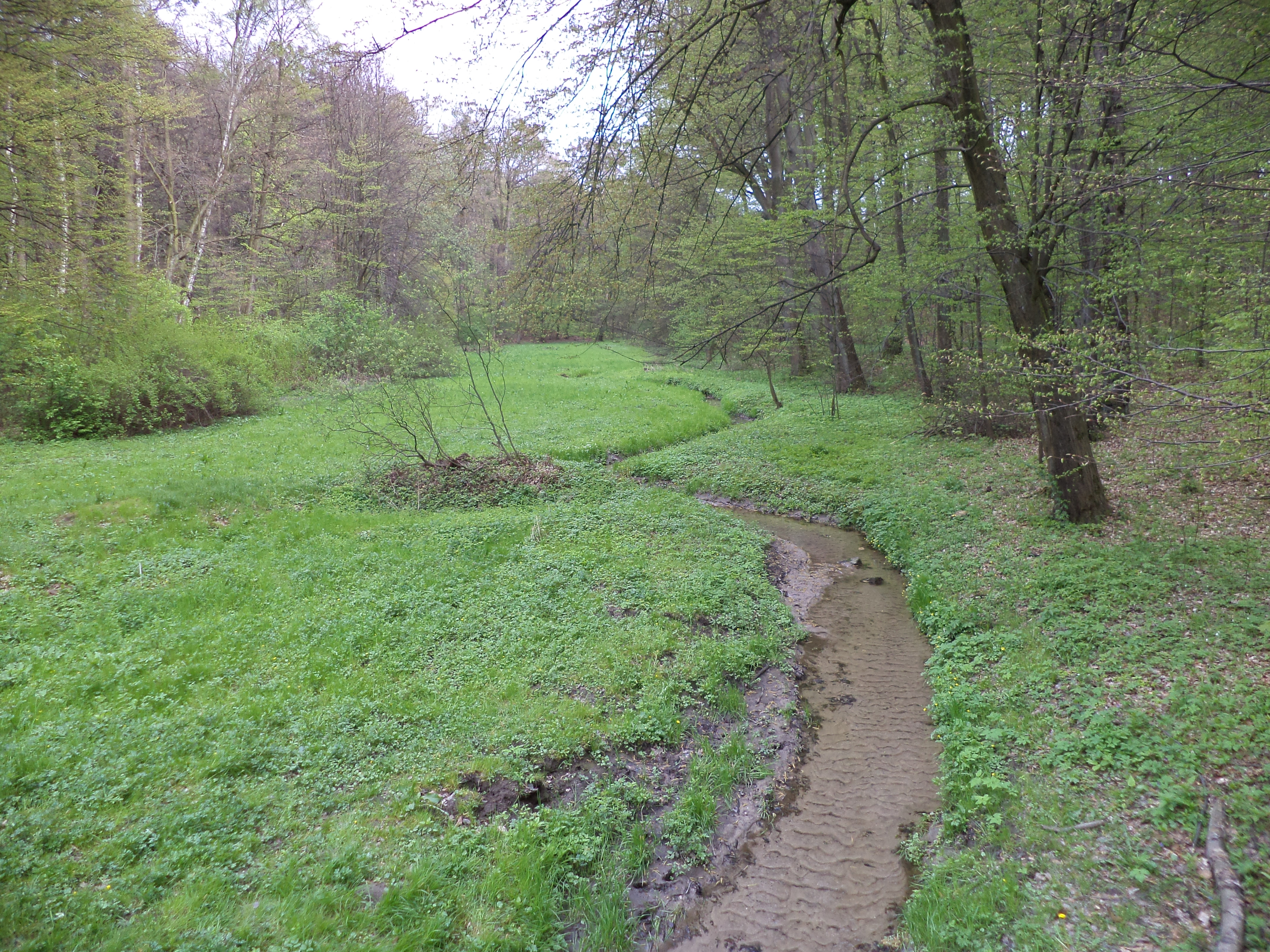
- Drama river meandering through Repecki Park

Location
- Country: Poland

Physical characteristics
- Source: Tarnowskie Góry
- Mouth: Dzierżno Dolne (Taciszów)
  - coordinates: 50°22′55″N 18°32′18″E
  - elevation: 200 m (660 ft) above sea level
- Length: 25.11 km (15.60 mi)

Drama is a river in Poland and a right tributary of the Kłodnica, with a length of 25.11 kilometres (15.60 mi).

== General information ==
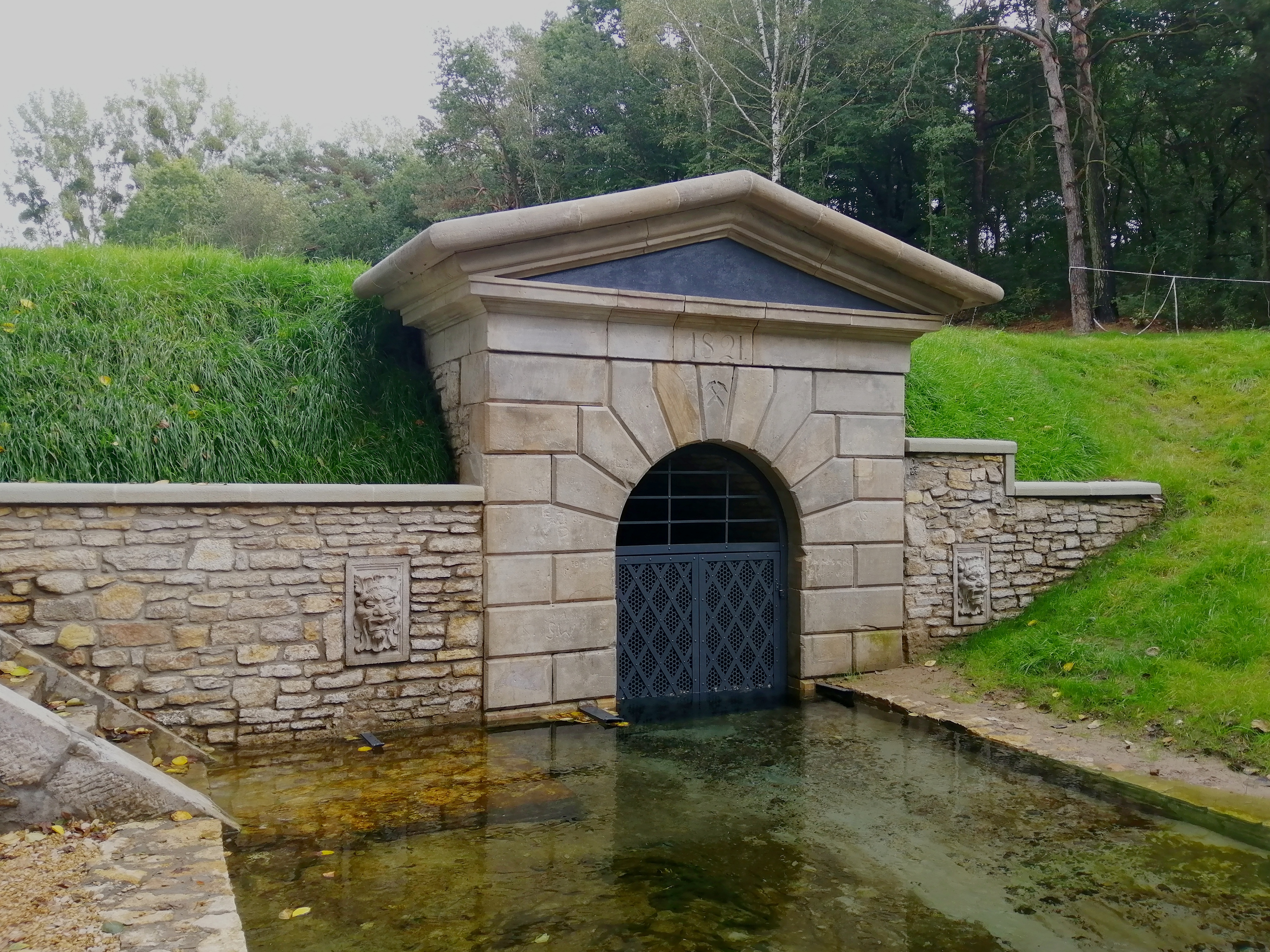
Outlet of the Black Trout Adit in Ptakowice

The Drama flows through the Silesian Voivodeship, Poland. It originates in Tarnowskie Góry, in the Repty Śląskie district (Nowe Repty), near Srebrna Góra, close to the Segiet Nature Reserve. In its upper reaches within Repty, it is also known as "Rów Repecki" (Repty Ditch) or "Potok Repecki" (Repty Stream). After leaving Tarnowskie Góry, the river flows through Gmina Zbrosławice. In the fields of Ptakowice, below the park, it receives an artificial left tributary, Potok Czarnego Pstrąga (Black Trout Stream), a discharge from the Black Trout Adit.

Historically, the river began in the Segiet Forest, south of the Segiet colony and the former Segiet forester's lodge, as evidenced by fluvial sediments on geological maps. Today, its channel starts in Nowe Repty. In Stare Repty, the Drama is fed by water from the karstic Youth Spring. It then flows through the historic Repty Park and the Nature and Landscape Complex "Park in Repty and the Drama River Valley", where its valley is approximately 20 metres (66 ft) deep relative to surrounding areas. At the park's outlet, it receives a right tributary, Starotarnowicki Potok (Starotarnowicki Stream), also known as "Rów Starotarnowicki".

The Drama joins the Kłodnica in Dzierżno Dolne on the lands of Taciszów, just beyond the Gliwice Canal.

== Tributaries ==
=== From source to Jedlinka (Nowe Repty – Zawada) ===
Sources:

- Field tributary (joins in Nowe Repty) L
- Tributary from Ptakowski Forest (in Stare Repty) L
- Youth Spring (in Stare Repty) L
- Field tributary (in Stare Repty) L
- Field tributary from Brzozowa St. (in Stare Repty) R
- Mikołuszka (Lecynoga) (in Stare Repty) L
- Tributary from Repty Park (in Stare Repty) L
- Starotarnowicki Potok (in Stare Tarnowice) R
- Dopływ z Laryszowa (Rów Laryszowski) (in Ptakowice) R
- Eastern field tributary from Laryszów (in Ptakowice) R
- Western field tributary from Laryszów (in Ptakowice) R
- Dopływ spod Wilkowic (Rów Wilkowicki) (in Ptakowice) R
- Potok Czarnego Pstrąga (discharge from Black Trout Adit) (in Ptakowice) L
- Field tributary (in Zbrosławice) R
- Field tributary (in Zbrosławice) L
- Dopływ z Ptakowic (Rów Ptakowicki) (in Zbrosławice) L
- Field tributary (in Zbrosławice) L
- Old Drama channel (in Zbrosławice) R
- Tributary from Gustavshöhe (in Kępczowice) R
- Tributary from Józefka (in Kępczowice) R
- Tributary from Kępczowice (in Nierada) L
- Tributary from Szufajda (in Nierada) R
- Field tributary (in Kamieniec) R
- Tributary from Glinica (in Kamieniec) L
- Pond in Kamieniec L
- Tributary from Konary (in Kamieniec) L
- Eastern manor tributary (in Kamieniec) R
- Western manor tributary (in Kamieniec) R
- Tributary from Łubki (in Kamieniec) R
- Old Drama channel from Kamieniec (in Karchowice) R
- Sroczka (in Karchowice) R
- Jedlinka (in Zawada) L
