= Spoil tip in Tarnowskie Góry =

World Heritage Site in Tarnowskie Góry, Poland

Coordinates: 50°24′55″N 18°51′17″E

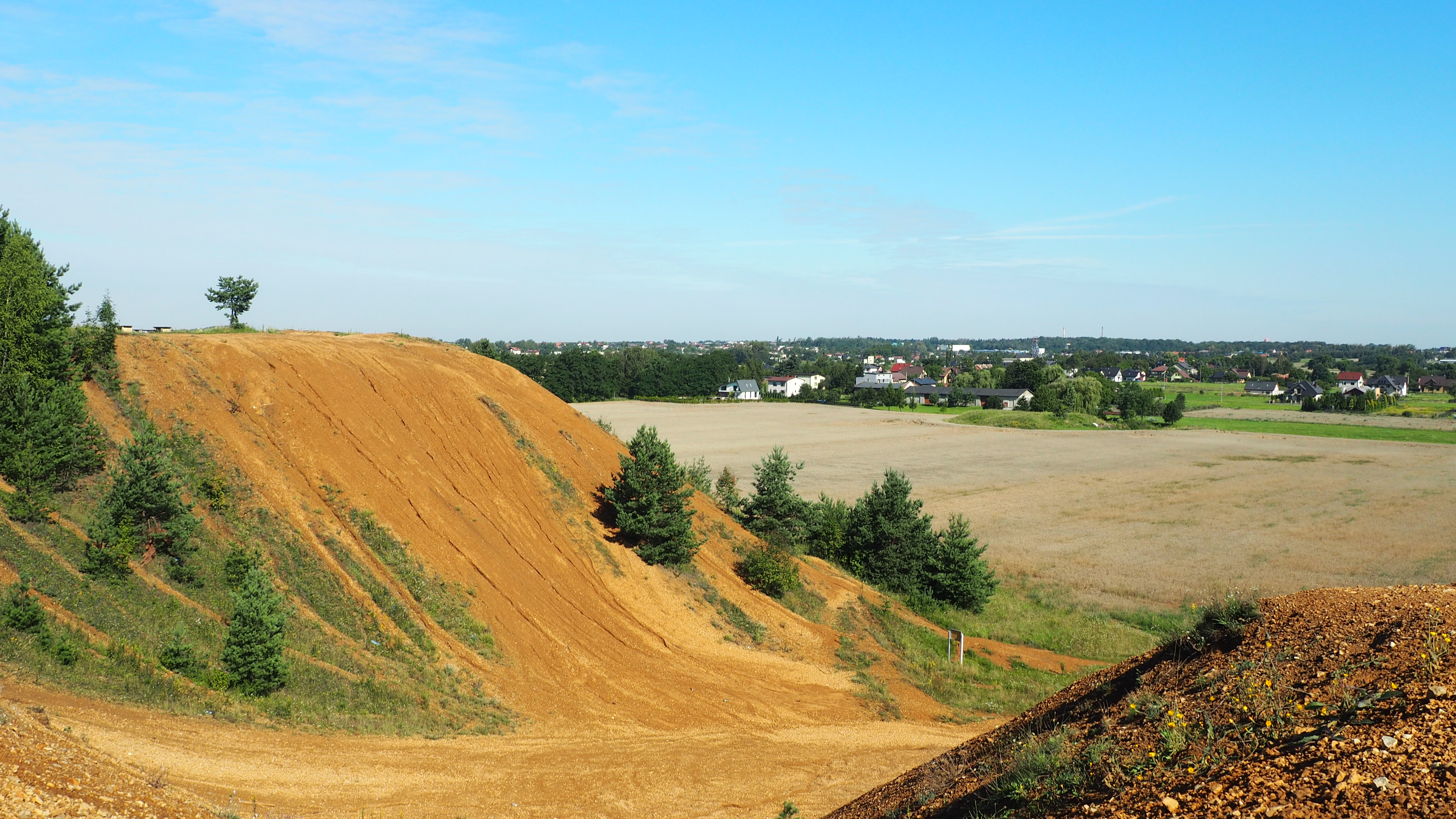
- Northern slope of the spoil tip

Highest point
- Prominence: 17 m (56 ft)

Geography
- Location: Tarnowskie Góry, Poland

Geology
- Mountain type: spoil tip

The spoil tip (Polish: hałda popłuczkowa) in Tarnowskie Góry, Poland, was formed from the accumulation of dolomite waste during the peak of lead, silver, and zinc ore extraction at the Royal Friedrich Mine (German: Königliche Friedrichsgrube) in Bobrowniki (now part of Tarnowskie Góry).

Since 2006, the site has been protected as part of the Hałda Popłuczkowa culture park, which is listed in the municipal registry of historical sites in Tarnowskie Góry, covering an area of 6.77 hectares. In 2017, the spoil tip, along with 27 other sites, was included on the UNESCO lists of World Heritage Sites.

== Location ==
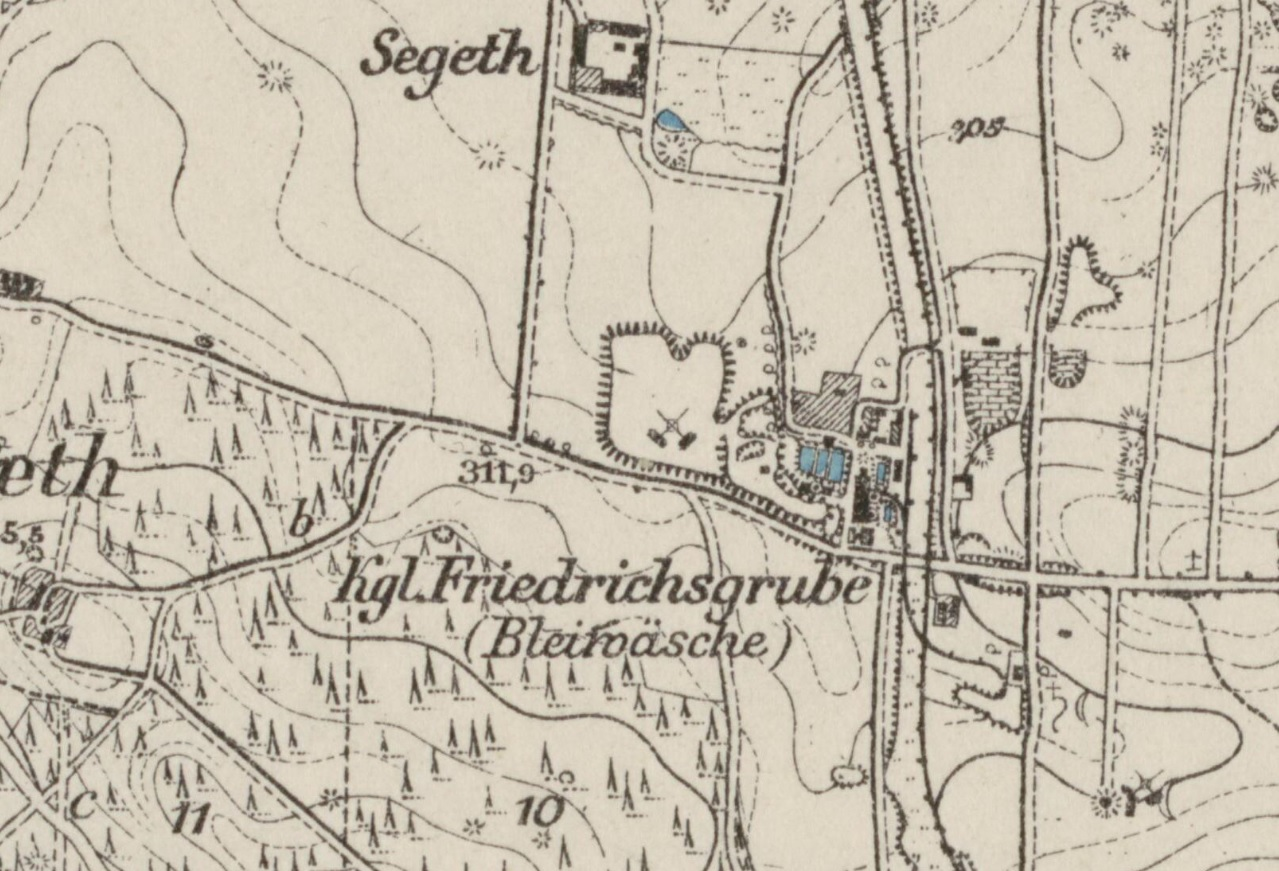
Fryderyk Mine washer – fragment of a map from 1925

The spoil tip is located in the southern part of Tarnowskie Góry, in the Bobrowniki Śląskie-Piekary Rudne district, approximately 4 km from the city center, near the border with Bytom. It borders agricultural areas and the disused quarry of the former Bobrowniki dolomite mine. Nearby, there is also the Segiet Nature Reserve and the Historic Silver Mine.

To the east of the spoil tip runs the tourist line of the Upper Silesian Narrow-Gauge Railway from Bytom to Miasteczko Śląskie; the nearest station (Tarnowskie Góry Kopalnia Srebra) is located 1.2 km from the spoil tip. Access to the spoil tip is provided by the streets: Mała and Długa from the west, north, and south, and Kopalniana from the east.

== History ==
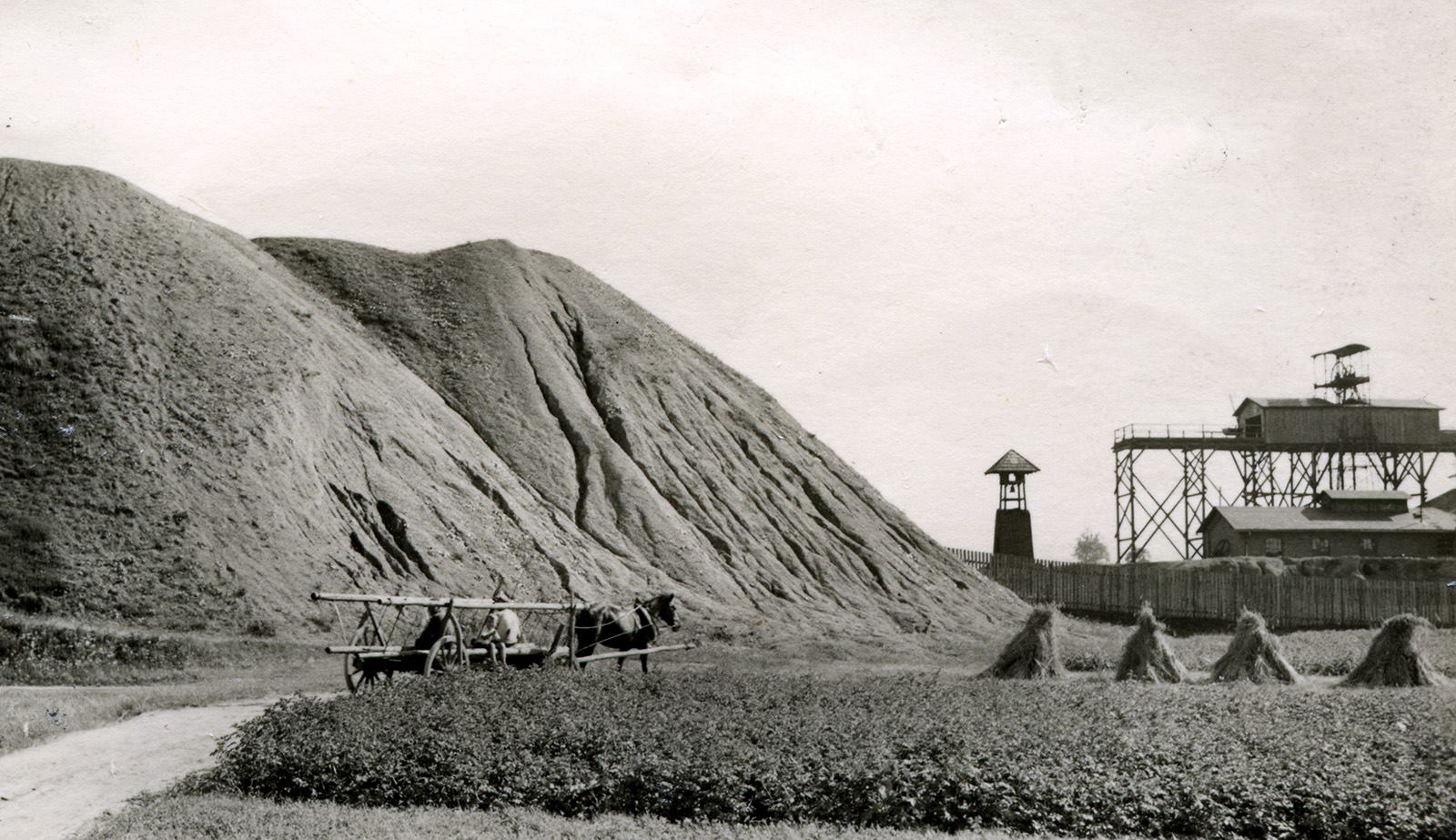
Spoil tip with the Miners' Belfry before 1941

The origins of the spoil tip date back to the 1830s and 1840s, when a modern processing plant – a washer – was built on the border between the Bobrowniki and Sucha Góra mining regions, part of the Royal Friedrich Mine, between the Sophia and Frieden shafts. The plant was designed by Rudolf von Carnall and was used to process dolomite extracted from the mine, separating lead ore (galena), silver, zinc, and iron ore. The plant was modernized in 1867, resulting in increased zinc production and a significant expansion of the facility. Between 1882 and 1887, the plant processed between 20,000 and 30,000 tons of ore, contributing to the growing amount of waste from the washing process. The plant's efficiency reached 9.3 tons per hour, with 7.5 tons of raw material produced from every 100 tons of extracted ore.

The washer that gave rise to the spoil tip operated until 1912. Its area, along with the buildings and equipment, was handed over to the Oberschlesische Eisenindustrie AG company.

At the end of World War II, the spoil tip was incorporated into the German defense system, and remnants of this include four reinforced concrete shooting bunkers – two on the eastern side and two on the western side – as well as some trenches, which are now somewhat faded.

Until the beginning of 1955, an old 19th-century Miners' Belfry stood near the mound. It was relocated that same year to the site of the former miners' meeting house in the city center.

== Characteristics ==
The spoil tip has the shape of a tableland in the form of the letter L, with a flat summit and steep slopes. Its height is about 17 meters, and its volume is estimated at around 26.5 million m³.

== Natural and landscape resources ==
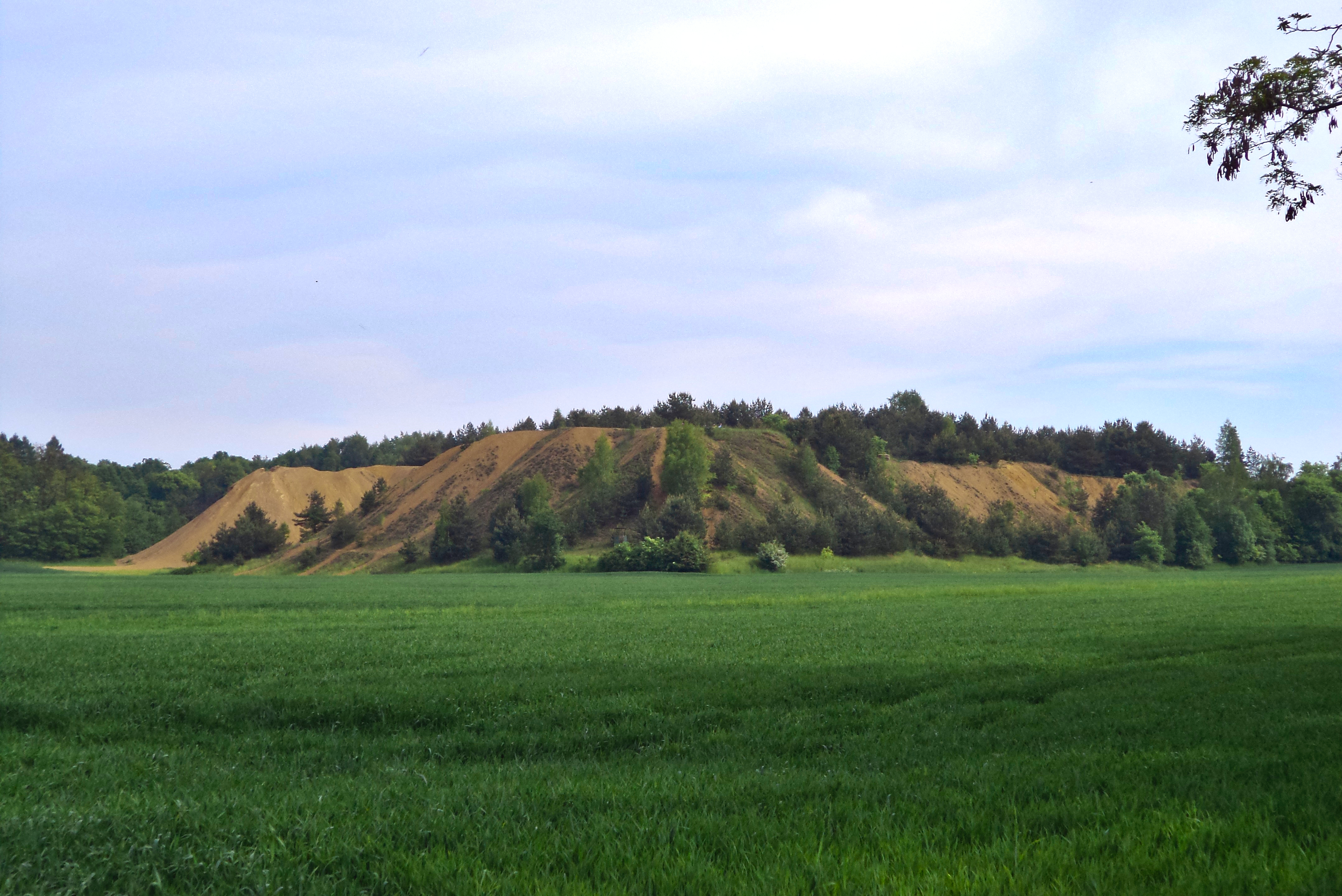
Spoil tip from the southwest (from Mała Street)

Due to its anthropogenic origin, the spoil tip is a site where primary ecological succession has occurred. Vegetation – initially low, later becoming more tree-like – gradually expanded from the south and southeast. The tree species found on the spoil tip include wych elms, linden trees, silver birches, rowans, and dwarf-growing Scotch pines. Currently, only the youngest, northernmost part of the peak and the northern slope are not covered by vegetation.

A characteristic feature of the spoil tip's vegetation are the so-called galman meadows, which host galman plants resistant to high concentrations of heavy metals in the soil, especially zinc and lead. These meadows mostly cover the northern part of the mound, which remains exposed. Notable species in this community include bladder campion and broad-leaved thyme. Additionally, protected species such as common centaury, stemless carline thistle, and broad-leaved helleborine can be found. The spoil tip also supports species typical of xerothermic meadows, such as cream pincushions and greater knapweed. Other species present include grey hair-grass, blue hair grass, goldmoss stonecrop, mouse-ear hawkweed, cypress spurge, and carline thistle.

The fauna of the spoil tip is represented by numerous insects, birds (such as common pheasants and grey partridges), the European hare, and thermophilic reptiles, mainly lizards.

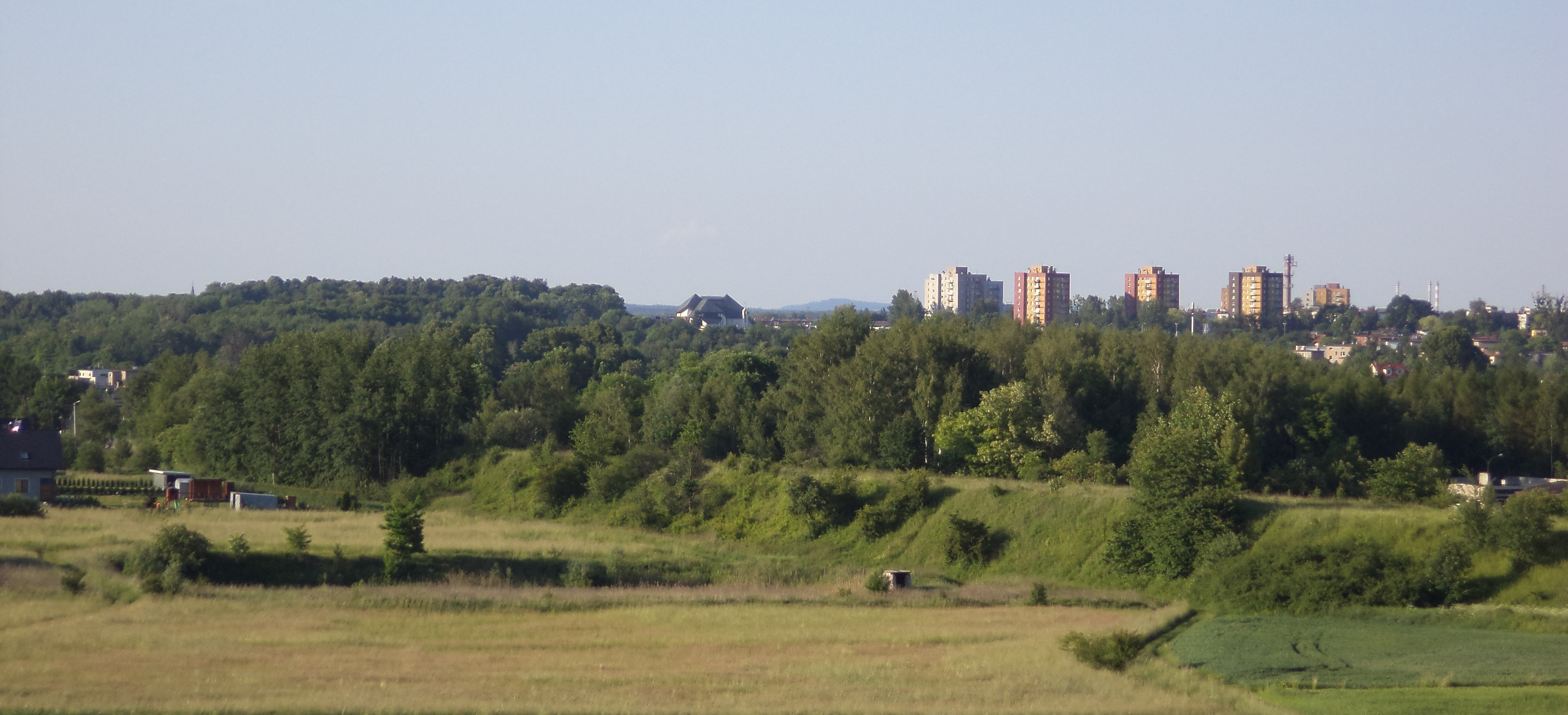
View from the spoil tip in the northeast direction

The spoil tip stands out as a prominent feature in the surrounding landscape. Due to its height and the easy access to the flat summit in the western and northwestern parts, the spoil tip is a popular viewpoint. From the spoil tip, there is a panoramic view of Tarnowskie Góry, including visible landmarks such as the towers of St. Nicholas Church in Repty Śląskie and the new St. Martin Church, the historic Repty Park, the waterworks station on Reden Hill, the towers of St. Peter and Paul Church, the Church of the Savior, and the town hall in Tarnowskie Góry's Market Square. Additionally, the panorama includes the Fathers of Camillian Park with the bell tower of St. John the Baptist and St. Camillus Church, the Church of Our Lady of Health, chimneys of the Miasteczko Śląskie Zinc Works, Grojec mountain in the distance, high-rise buildings at Osada Jana, and the buildings of Bobrowniki Śląskie-Piekary Rudne with the Church of the Transfiguration of the Lord. Closer to the spoil tip, visible structures include the sports hall in Tarnowskie Góry, the headframe of the Anioł shaft at the Historic Silver Mine, the buildings of the former Segiet farmstead, the embankment of the Upper Silesian Narrow-Gauge Railway, and the spoil tips of shafts from the former Friedrich Silver Mine: Nettelbeck, Minette, Carnall, Żmija, Staszic (along with the waterworks station), and the Comet and Bohr shafts.

Below the spoil tip runs the upper section of the Black Trout Adit from the Staszic shaft heading southeast. To the east of the narrow-gauge railway, the tunnel is likely damaged due to dolomite extraction at the quarries of the former Bobrowniki and Blachówka mines.

== Studies ==
At the end of March 2018, scientists from the Faculty of Earth Sciences at the University of Silesia in Katowice began research on the spoil tip, aiming, among other objectives, to create its three-dimensional model. Since 2018, as part of the Best Practices for Enhancing Biodiversity and Active Conservation of Galman Meadows in the Silesian-Cracow Region project (BioGalmany), the spoil tip has also been studied by researchers from the Faculty of Biology and Environmental Protection at the same university. Restoration efforts for the galman meadows have been undertaken, including the removal of some pines covering the spoil tip in February 2019.

== Threats ==
The primary threat to the spoil tip, particularly in terms of intensifying erosional processes – especially on the northern slope – is its use by motorcyclists and quad drivers. The state of the spoil tip is also at risk due to the extraction of material from which it was formed, an activity observed near the northeastern base of the site. For the rare galman meadows on the spoil tip, the encroachment of invasive plant species poses a significant danger. Notable threats include Japanese knotweed, spreading from the Pokój shaft to the southwest, and tall goldenrod and Canada goldenrod, encroaching from the south, west, and east.

== See also ==
- Historic Silver Mine in Tarnowskie Góry
- Silver Mountain (Srebrna Góra)
