= Tarnowskie Góry-Bytom Undergrounds =

Tarnowskie Góry-Bytom Underground Workings
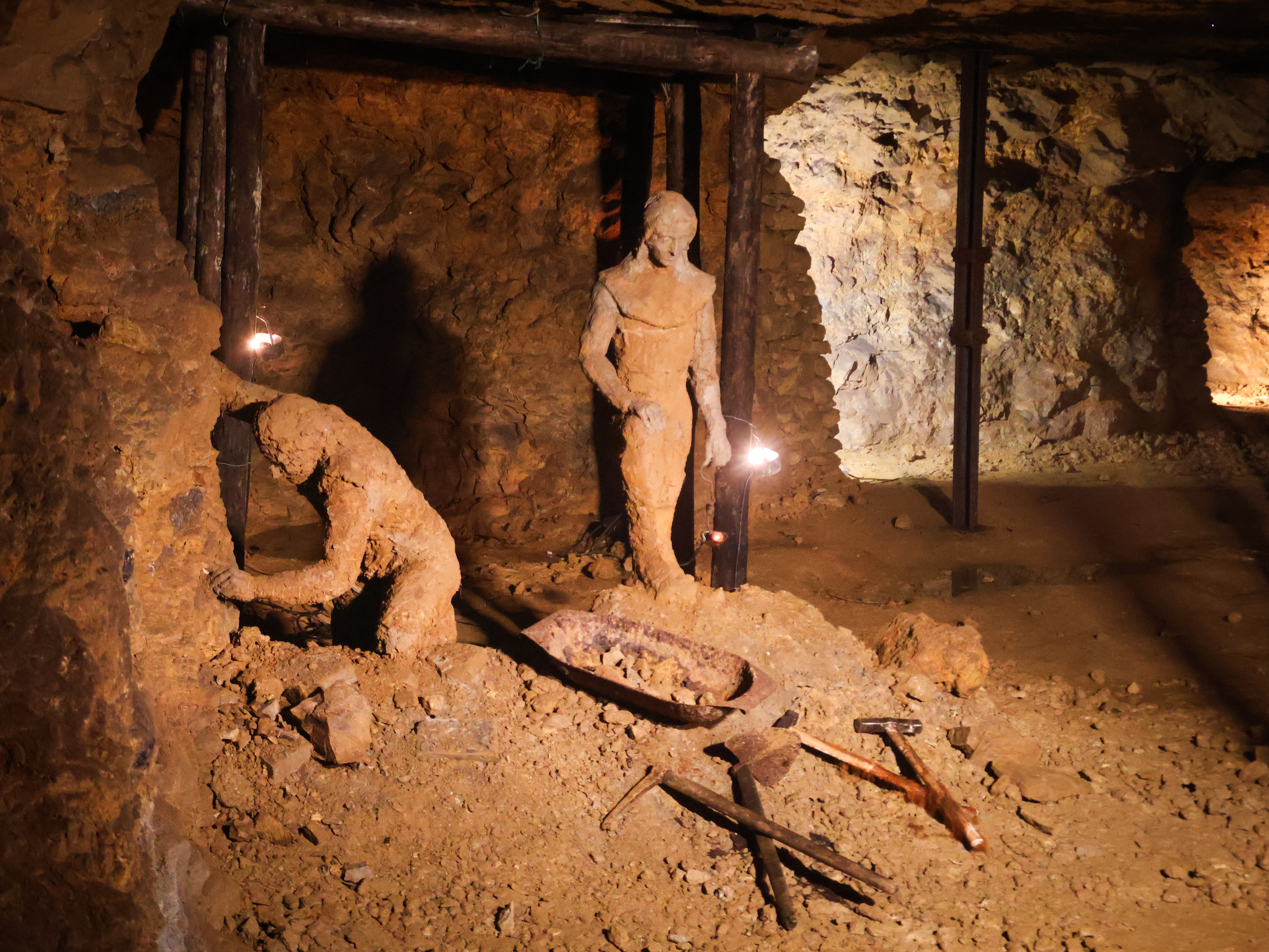
- Fragment of the underground workings on the tourist route of the Historic Silver Mine (2024)
- Interactive map of Tarnowskie Góry-Bytom Underground Workings
- Location: Bytom, Tarnowskie Góry, Radzionków, Zbrosławice, Silesian, Poland; 50°25′26″N 18°50′52″E
- Active: 12th–20th century

UNESCO World Heritage Site
- Official name: Underground Workings of the Historical Silver Mine
- Part of: Historic Silver Mine in Tarnowskie Góry
- Criteria: Cultural: (i)(ii)(iv)
- Reference: 1539
- Inscription: 2017 (41st Session)
- Website: unesco.tarnowskiegory.pl

The Tarnowskie Góry-Bytom Undergrounds (Polish: Podziemia Tarnogórsko-Bytomskie) are one of the largest systems of underground mine workings in Poland and Europe, a remnant of centuries-long silver ore extraction at the Fryderyk Mine within the Tarnowskie Góry Ridge.

The underground workings of the former ore mine comprise a network of adits, galleries, excavations, and shafts beneath Tarnowskie Góry and its surrounding area. Together with the preserved technical infrastructure, they document the history of ore extraction from approximately the 15th century.

By the decree of the President of the Republic of Poland on 14 April 2004, Tarnowskie Góry — the underground workings of the historic Silver Ore Mine and the Black Trout Adit, were entered on the list of Historic Monuments; in 2017 it was inscribed onto the UNESCO World Heritage List alongside the Historic Silver Mine in Tarnowskie Góry.

== History ==
The earliest records of ore mining in the Tarnowskie Góry area are recorded in a papal bull issued by Pope Innocent II in 1136; documents from 1247 specifically mention the mining of galena in the Repty area — making the region of Tarnowskie Góry one of the oldest mining centres in Europe. At that time, mining was carried out through small shafts with either square or circular cross-sections, none of which exceeded one metre in diameter. Due to waterlogged terrain, mining took place mostly on elevated ground. As a result, numerous traces of medieval extraction can still be seen on the nearby elevations, including Sucha Góra (lit. 'Dry Mountain') and Srebrna Góra (lit. 'Silver Mountain').

At the turn of the 15th and 16th centuries, Tarnowskie Góry’s mining industry experienced its first period of decline, likely connected to the depletion of shallow ore deposits. In the mid-16th century, the accidental discovery of galena outcrops revived mining activity. It became the era of the greatest prosperity for local mining, as well as for the town of Tarnowskie Góry itself. The most intensive period of work took place between 1556 and 1559, during which up to 2,500 new shafts may have been constructed annually. The average lead production from local ores amounted approximately 600–800 tonnes per year, and at the height of prosperity it reached up to 3,000 tonnes. These ores were rich in silver (with content ranging from 0.1% to 3%), and there were also recorded instances of uncovered native silver.

== Natural Environment ==
The Tarnowskie Góry–Bytom Undergrounds were created as a result of mining activity carried out from the 12th to the 20th century. The adits, shafts, galleries, chambers, and stopes formed in this process, with a total length of more than 300 km, have become the largest wintering site for bats in Upper Silesia and the second largest in all of Poland. Researchers have identified 10 bat species in the underground system, including the greater mouse-eared bat and Bechstein's bat. In the southern part of the inactive Blachówka excavation, openings in the extraction wall serve as entrances through which bats travel from the underground to the surface. These openings also serve as ventilation apetures for the network of subterranean corridors.

== Bibliography ==
- Kwak, Jan (2000). "Tarnowskie Góry w okresie habsburskim (1526-1763). Życie gospodarczo-społeczne – górnictwo". In Drabina, Jan (ed.). Historia Tarnowskich Gór (in Polish). Tarnowskie Góry: Muzeum w Tarnowskich Górach. ISBN 83-911508-3-6.
