= Chapel of the Blessed Virgin Mary, Bytom =

Church in Silesian Voivodeship, Poland

Chapel of the Blessed Virgin Mary
- Polish: Kaplica Najświętszej Marii Panny
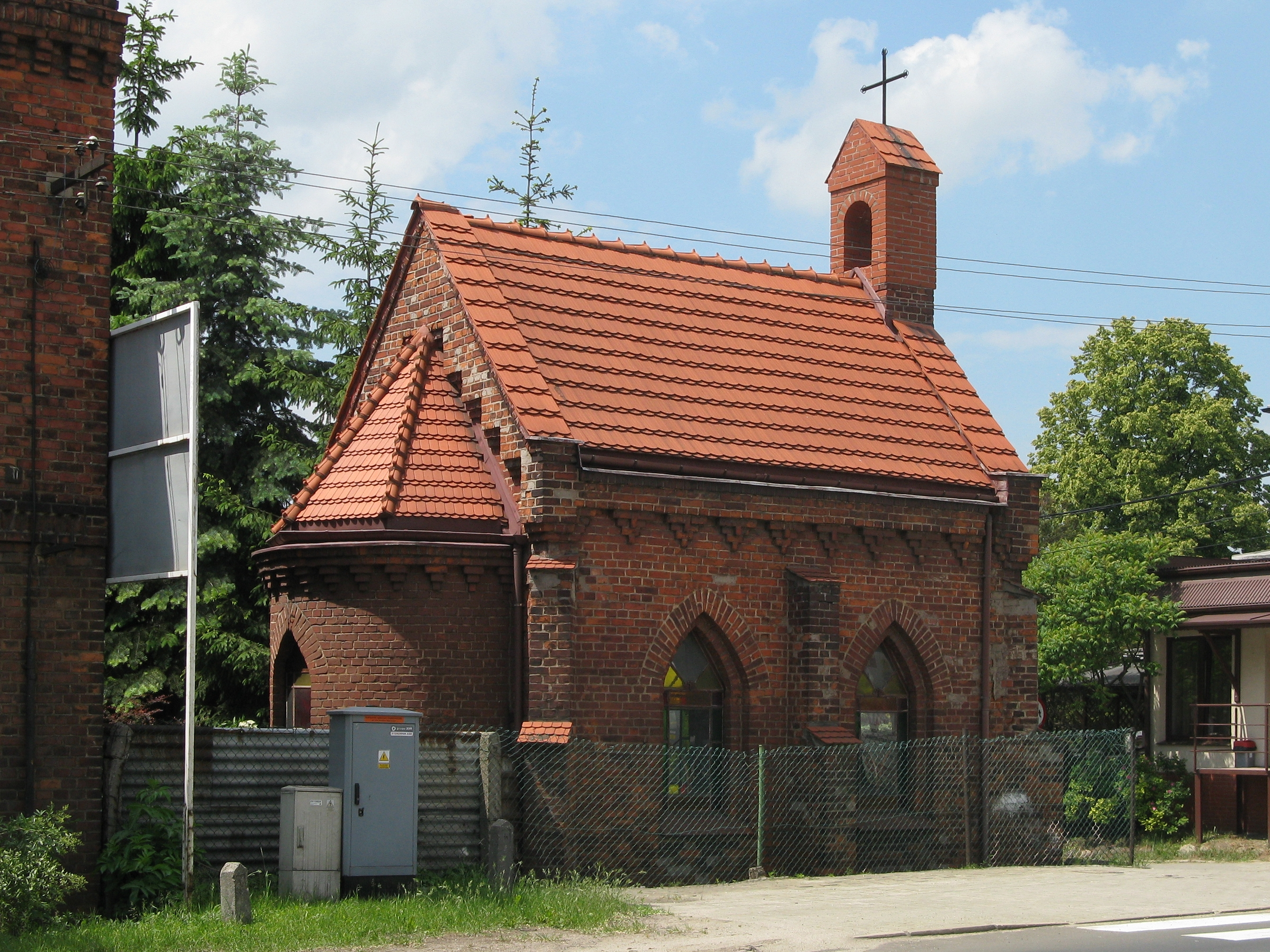
- The chapel in 2018.
- Chapel of the Blessed Virgin Mary
- 50°24′12″N 18°52′19″E
- Location: Bytom (Sucha Góra)
- Address: ul. Niepodległości/ul. Strzelców Bytomskich
- Country: Poland
- Denomination: Catholic

Architecture
- Style: Neogothic
- Completed: 1868

The Chapel of the Blessed Virgin Mary in Bytom (Polish: Kaplica Najświętszej Marii Panny w Bytomiu) is a chapel situated in Bytom-Sucha Góra, Poland, on Niepodległości Street, inscribed on the Municipal Registry of Monuments of Bytom.

It is an oriented, freestanding brick chapel. A small wooden church bell is mounted on its roof ridge. The structure is single-nave, spanned by a cross vault. Its dominating architectural style is Gothic Revival.

== History ==
There are two accounts of how the structure came to be. According to first version, a Jew, Jakubowicz by name, raised the chapel in 1868. As per the second, the building was constructed by master Hoffman with donations from residents in honour of Our Lady of the Rosary.

In 1950, it was decided to convert the chapel's function to serve as a catechetical hall until a new church in Sucha Góra was constructed.

== Furnishings ==
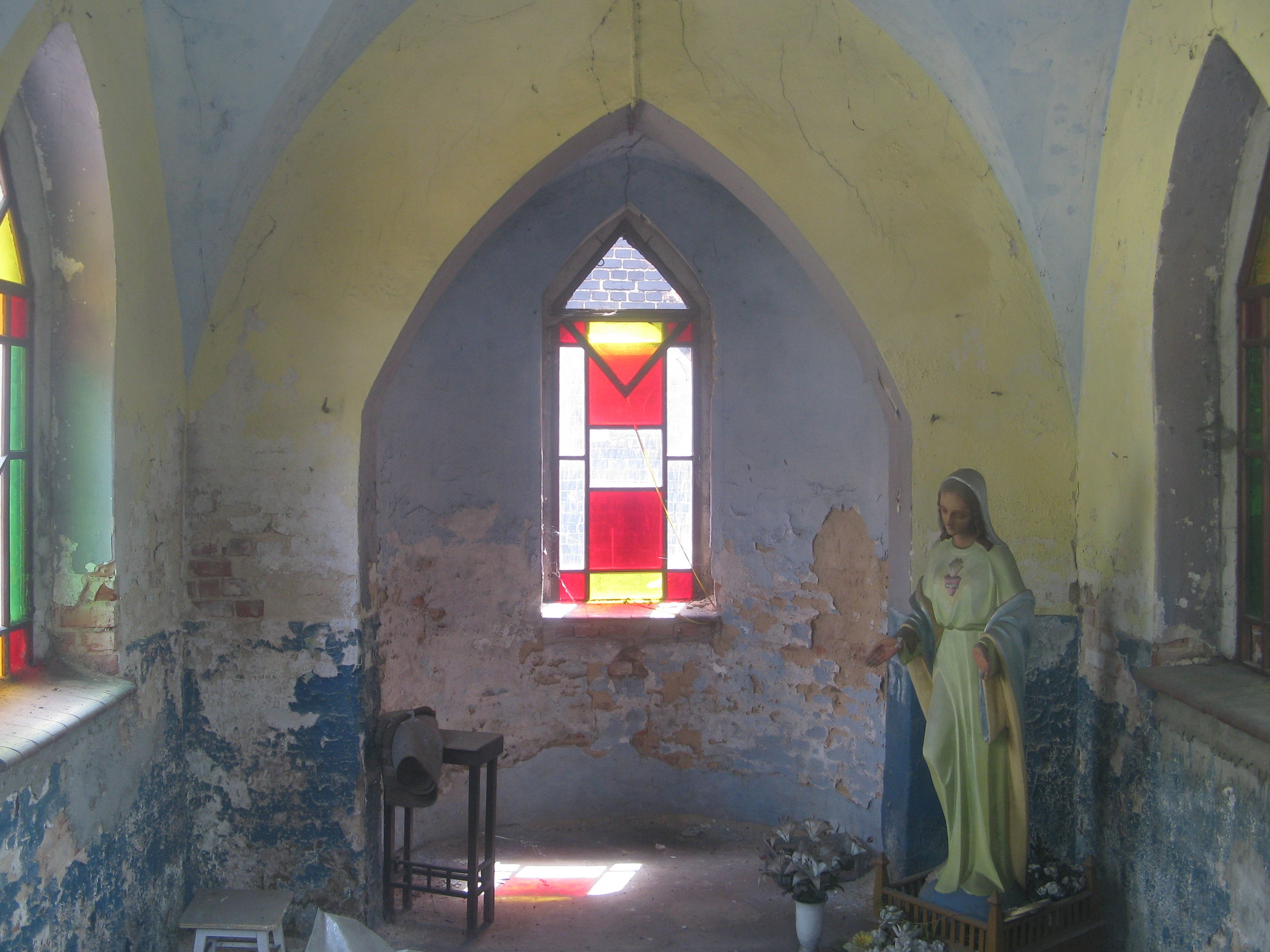
The interior of the chapel, 2018

The chapel once housed a Neogothic altar featuring a painting of Our Lady of the Rosary from 1841 by the Cracovian painter Michał Rogowski, as well as the figures of the Sacred Heart of Jesus and Mary. On the vault, there was a painting depicting Jesus, the Good Shepherd.
