= Srebrna Góra (Tarnowskie Góry Ridge) =

Silver Mountain
- Srebrna Góra
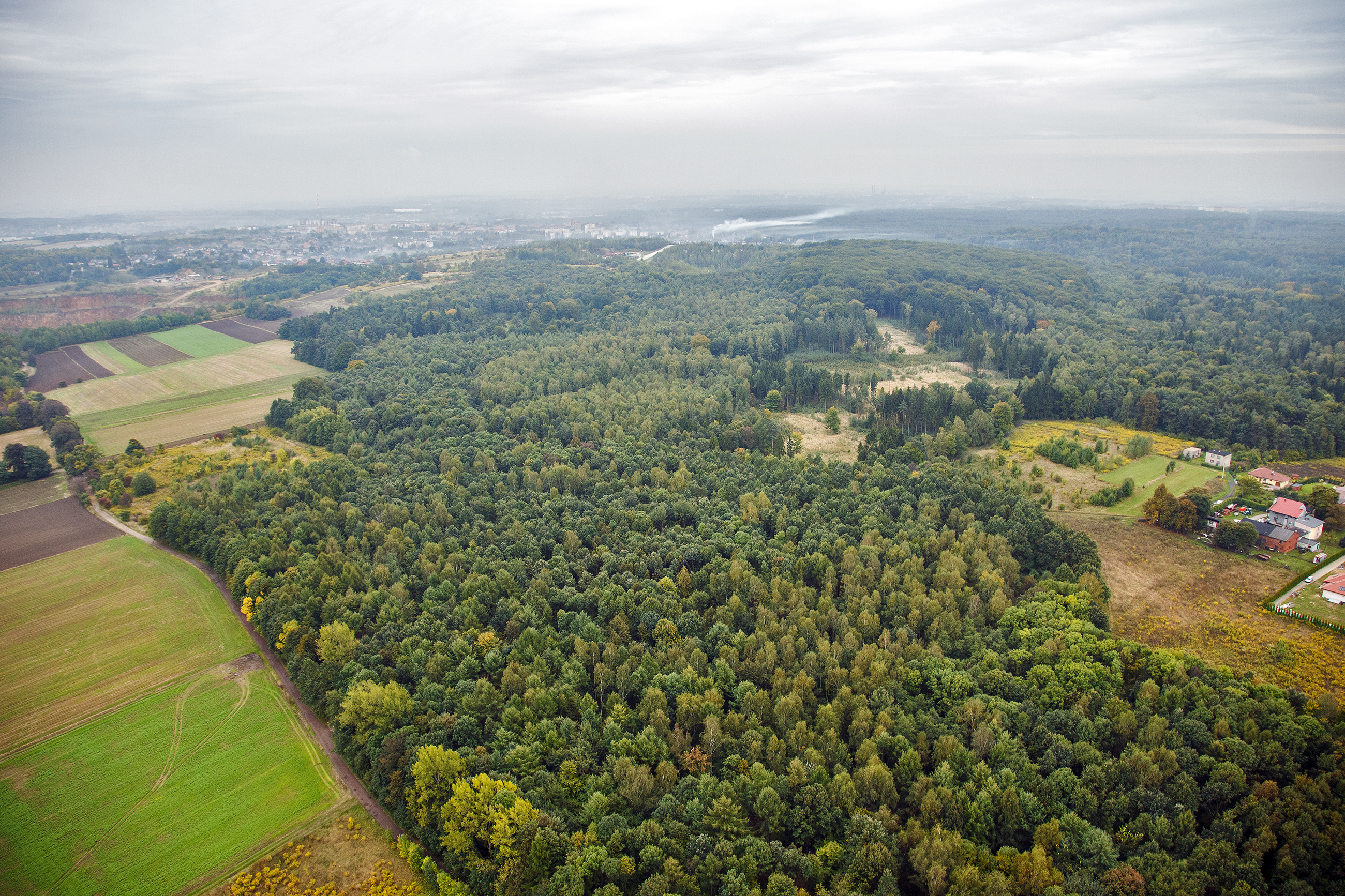
- Aerial view of Srebrna Góra

Highest point
- Peak: 347 m (1,138 ft)
- Coordinates: 50°24′27″N 18°50′55″E

Geography
- Country: Poland
- Voivodeship: Silesian
- City: Bytom (Sucha Góra); Tarnowskie Góry

UNESCO World Heritage Site
- Official name: Post-mining landscape of Silver Mountain
- Part of: Historic Silver Mine in Tarnowskie Góry
- Criteria: Cultural: (i)(ii)(iv)
- Reference: 1539
- Inscription: 2017 (41st Session)
- Website: unesco.tarnowskiegory.pl

Srebrna Góra, or Silver Mountain, is a natural elevation which stretches between the cities of Bytom and Tarnowskie Góry in Poland, reaching a height of 347 metres.
Its surface bears witness to intense medieval lead and silver mining. In the 19th century, mining at the site renewed, focusing on the extraction of zinc ore, largely driven by the Royal Friedrich Mine in Tarnowskie Góry.

In 1953 its area was incorporated into Bytom's Segiet Nature Reserve; in 2017 it was inscribed onto the UNESCO World Heritage List with the Historic Silver Mine in Tarnowskie Góry.

== History ==
The topography of Srebrna Góra reflects local lead and silver mining activities which took place in the 15th and 16th centuries, and possibly as early as the late 12th and 13th centuries. During this period, the extraction of silver-bearing lead ore significantly impacted Bytom's economy and contributed to the establishment and development of Tarnowskie Góry. Local silver was primarily distributed to mints, while extracted lead was exported to mining and metallurgical centres across Europe, where silver, copper, and gold was extracted from local ores.

Mining at the site was renewed in the 19th century, particularly the extraction of zinc ore. Ore-bearing rock was extracted from shallow open-pit shafts before being crushed, manually separated and washed (either in nearby streams or with water pumped from underground). Hoists, akin to those used in wells, were employed to lift materials, while pumps were installed to drain the mines. During this period, several mining fields were established, namely: Beschert Freude (Przynosi Radość), Freudschaft (Przyjaźń), Segiet and Verona, whose operation drastically reshaped local topography through the accumulation of mining waste—forming distinctive mounds. Ultimately, in 1837, the Royal Friedrich Mine was expanded, engulfing the mines situated on Srebrna Góra, leading to a significant increase in local zinc production.

In 1953 the Segiet Nature Reserve was established, lying mostly within Bytom's borders it encompasses Srebrna Góra. In 2017, Srebrna Góra was inscribed onto the UNESCO World Heritage List with the Historic Silver Mine in Tarnowskie Góry—officially as the "post-mining landscape of Silver Mountain".

== Tourism ==
Srebrna Góra is one of the highest elevations in the region; and is accessible from Blachówka Street in Bytom or from Długa Street in Tarnowskie Góry. The natural elevation lies within the Segiet Nature Reserve and is publicly accessible. Exploration of the area can be done either on foot or by bicycle. While some of the earliest mining pits in the area remain dry, ones from later periods, such as Segiet, are now completely flooded. In total, the remnants of around 14,000 shafts are scattered across the landscape of Srebrna Góra.

The tourist trail of the Historic Silver Mine in Tarnowskie Góry and the Segiet Educational Forest Trail run through the post-mining landscape of Srebrna Góra. The site is listed on the UNESCO World Heritage Site, and moreover on the Industrial Monuments Route of the Silesian Voivodeship alongside the Historic Silver Mine.

== See also ==
- Historic Silver Mine in Tarnowskie Góry
- Spoil tip in Tarnowskie Góry
