= Ptakowice, Silesian Voivodeship =

Ptakowice
- Village
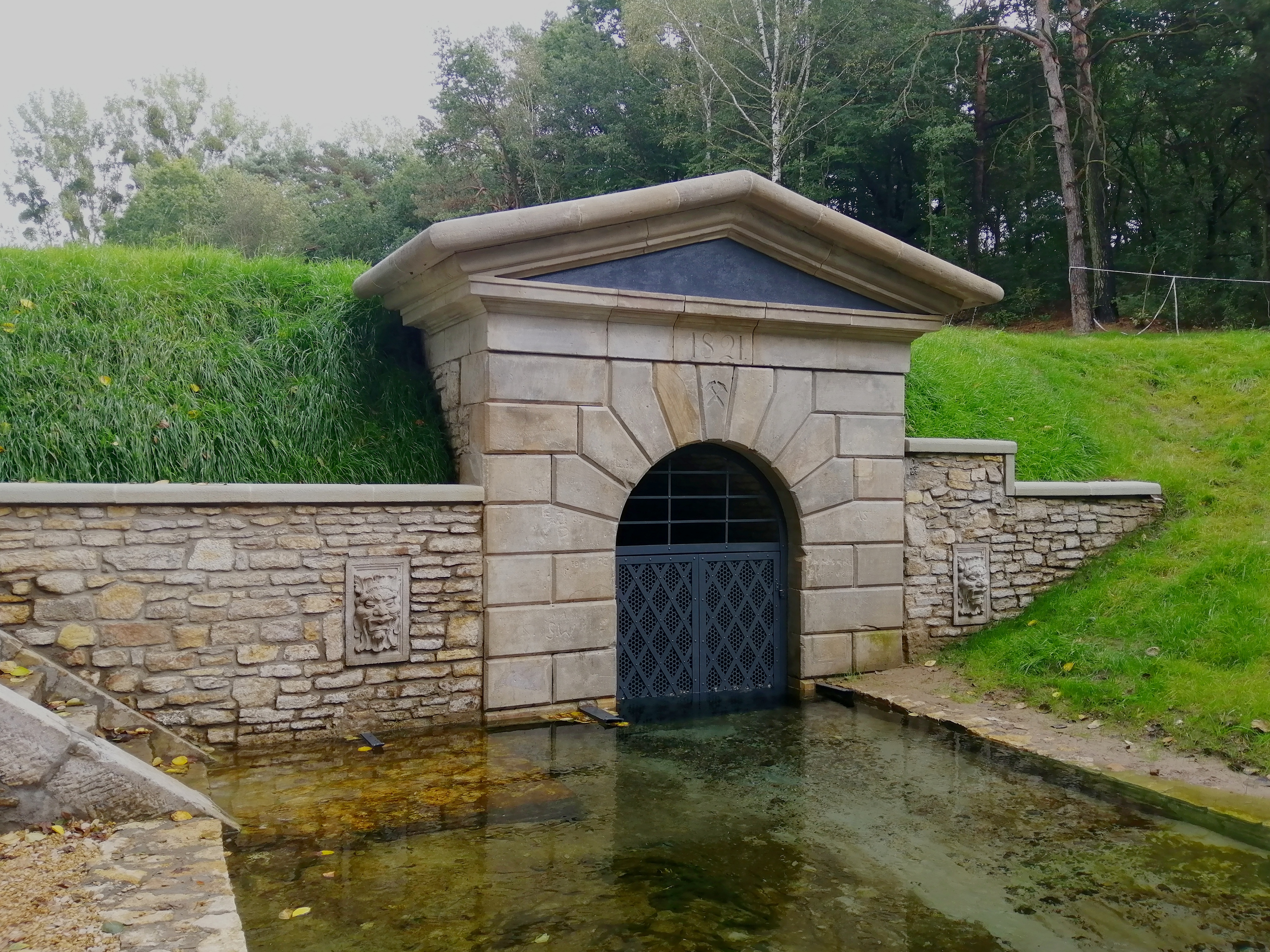
- Portal of the Black Trout Adit in Ptakowice

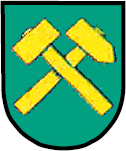
- Coat of arms

- Location within Poland
- Coordinates: 50°25′N 18°47′E
- Country: Poland
- Voivodeship: Silesian
- County: Tarnowskie Góry
- Gmina: Zbrosławice
- Highest elevation: 360 m (1,180 ft)
- Lowest elevation: 340 m (1,120 ft)

Population
  - Total: 748
- Time zone: UTC+1 (CET)
  - Summer (DST): UTC+2 (CEST)
- Postal code: 42-674
- Vehicle registration: STA
- Primary airport: Katowice Airport

Ptakowice [ptakɔˈvit͡sɛ] is a village in the administrative district of Gmina Zbrosławice, within Tarnowskie Góry County, Silesian Voivodeship, in southern Poland.

The name of the village is of Polish origin and comes from the word ptak, which means "bird".

The Black Trout Adit, part of the Historic Silver Mine in Tarnowskie Góry, a UNESCO World Heritage Site and Historic Monument of Poland, is located in Ptakowice.

In 1822, calamine deposits were discovered in the village. In 1861, the village had a population of 714.

== Transport ==
The A1 motorway runs nearby, south of the village.
