= Tarnowskie Góry Ridge =

Geographical region in southern Poland

Tarnowskie Góry Ridge Garb Tarnogórski (Polish)
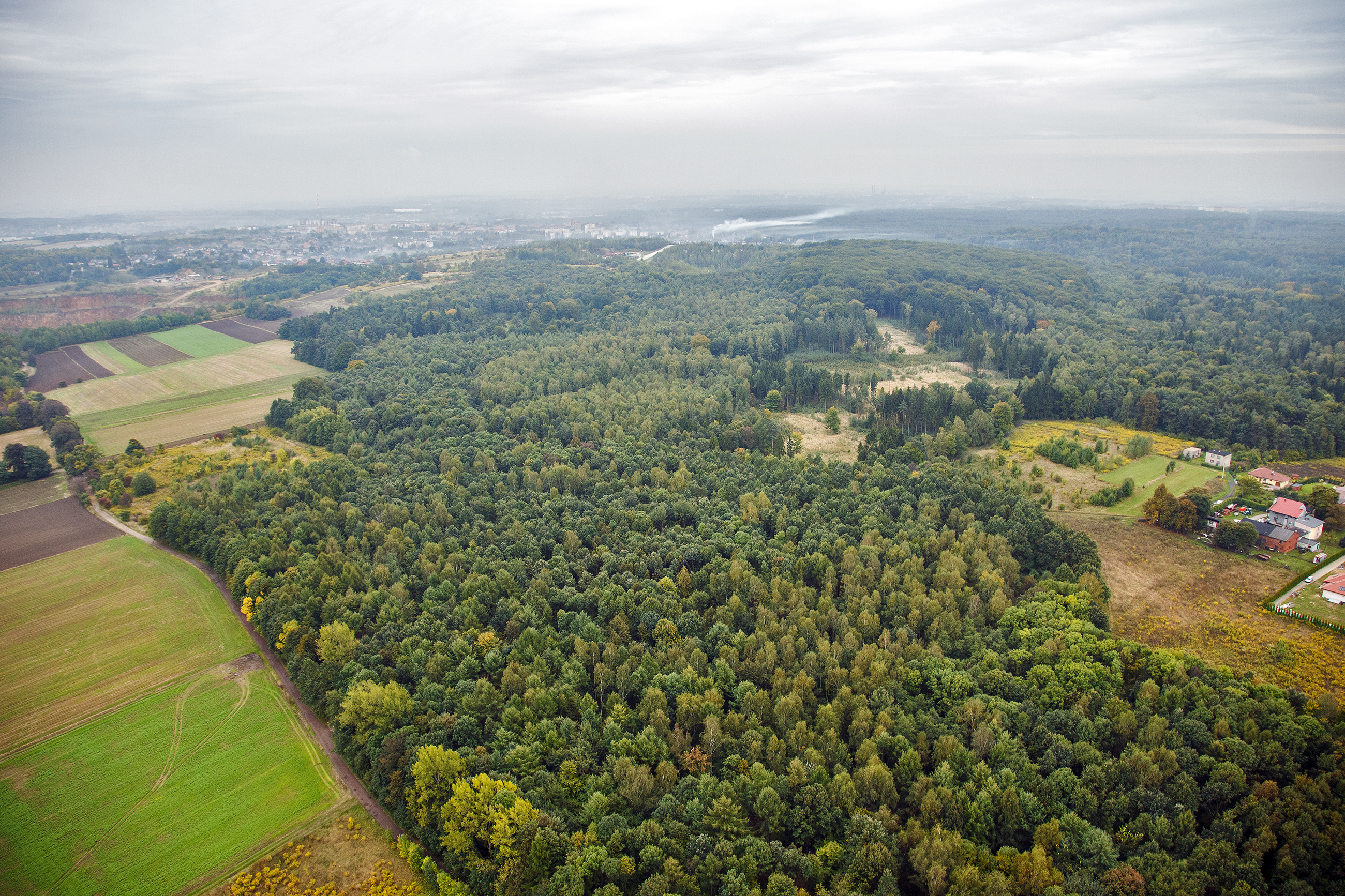
- Forested Segiet Nature Reserve on the border of Tarnowskie Góry and Bytom

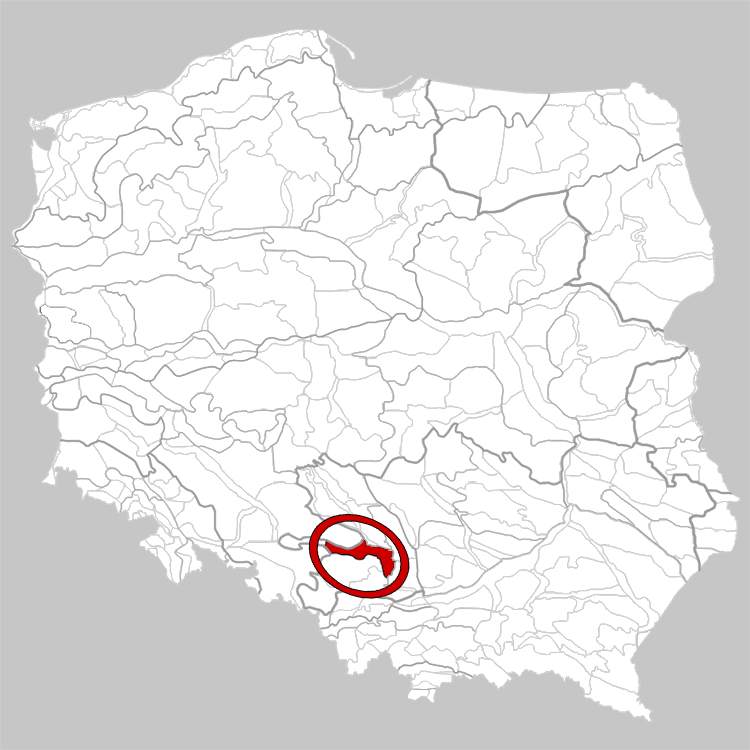
- Area of the Tarnowskie Góry Ridge according to J. Kondracki's 1994 regionalization
- Megaregion: Central European Plain
- Province: Polish Uplands
- Subprovince: Silesian-Kraków Upland
- Macroregion: Silesian Upland
- Country: Poland
- Voivodeship: Silesian Voivodeship

The Tarnowskie Góry Ridge is a geographical region characterized by a hilly landscape in southern Poland, near Tarnowskie Góry. It forms the northern edge of the Silesian Upland, adjacent to the Woźniki-Wieluń Upland. The region is predominantly agricultural but also has a mining heritage linked to Tarnowskie Góry, which has impacted its natural environment. The highest elevation is Łubianki Hill (398 m above sea level) near the village of Mierzęcice in Będzin County. The Tarnowskie Góry Ridge is designated as a mesoregion with the index 341.12 in Poland's physical-geographical regionalization.

== Natural environment ==
The Tarnowskie Góry Ridge is a 50 km long belt of hills, 4–12 km wide, covering an area of 410 km², stretching between Siewierz and Toszek. Its elevation rises from 260 to 300 m above sea level in the west, where it borders the Chełm region, to 340–380 m in the east, transitioning into the Jaworzno Hillocks. To the south, it neighbors the Bojszów Depression and the Katowice Upland, while to the north, it adjoins the Upper Mała Panew Depression and the Siewierz Basin.

Geologically, the ridge is a structural escarpment composed of limestone, marl, and dolomite from the Middle Triassic. It is dissected by river valleys and small basins of the Drama and Brynica rivers, forming a series of smaller ridges and plateaus. The predominant soils are podzolic, brown, and rendzinas. Agricultural land dominates (65%), with forests covering only 17% of the area, though beech forests are preserved in the Segiet Nature Reserve.

The region features a dense network of settlements and roads. Besides Tarnowskie Góry, notable towns and villages include Miasteczko Śląskie, Toszek, Wielowieś, Zbrosławice, and Świerklaniec. Post-industrial areas of the Tarnowskie Góry-Bytom Undergrounds are part of the Natura 2000 program, serving as habitats for various bat species. The development of Tarnowskie Góry's industry, tied to the extraction and processing of metal ores (zinc, lead, silver), has significantly degraded soils and water resources.

== Variations in geographical divisions ==
In Jerzy Kondracki's physical-geographical regionalization of Poland, the Tarnowskie Góry Ridge was assigned an area exceeding 1,000 km². Following Sylwia Gilewska's work, he identified several subregions: the Laryszów Ridge, Stare Tarnowice Plateau, Kolonia Józefka Basin in the Brynica breakthrough, Twardowice Plateau, Ząbkowice Ridge, and a northeastern belt of basin-like depressions along the Czarna Przemsza, Mitręga, and Biała Przemsza, unnamed by Kondracki but termed the Mitręga Basin by Gilewska.

According to the multi-author update of Kondracki's division in 2018, the boundaries of the Tarnowskie Góry Ridge were significantly revised. The Mitręga Basin was established as a separate mesoregion, the Siewierz Basin, within the Woźniki-Wieluń Upland, and the extensive Ząbkowice Ridge was incorporated into the Jaworzno Hillocks mesoregion. Conversely, a small area of the Sarnowskie Hills near Toszek, previously part of the Chełm region in Kondracki's classification, was added to the Tarnowskie Góry Ridge. These changes reduced the ridge's area by more than half, now estimated at 410 km².
