= Taciszów =

- Village
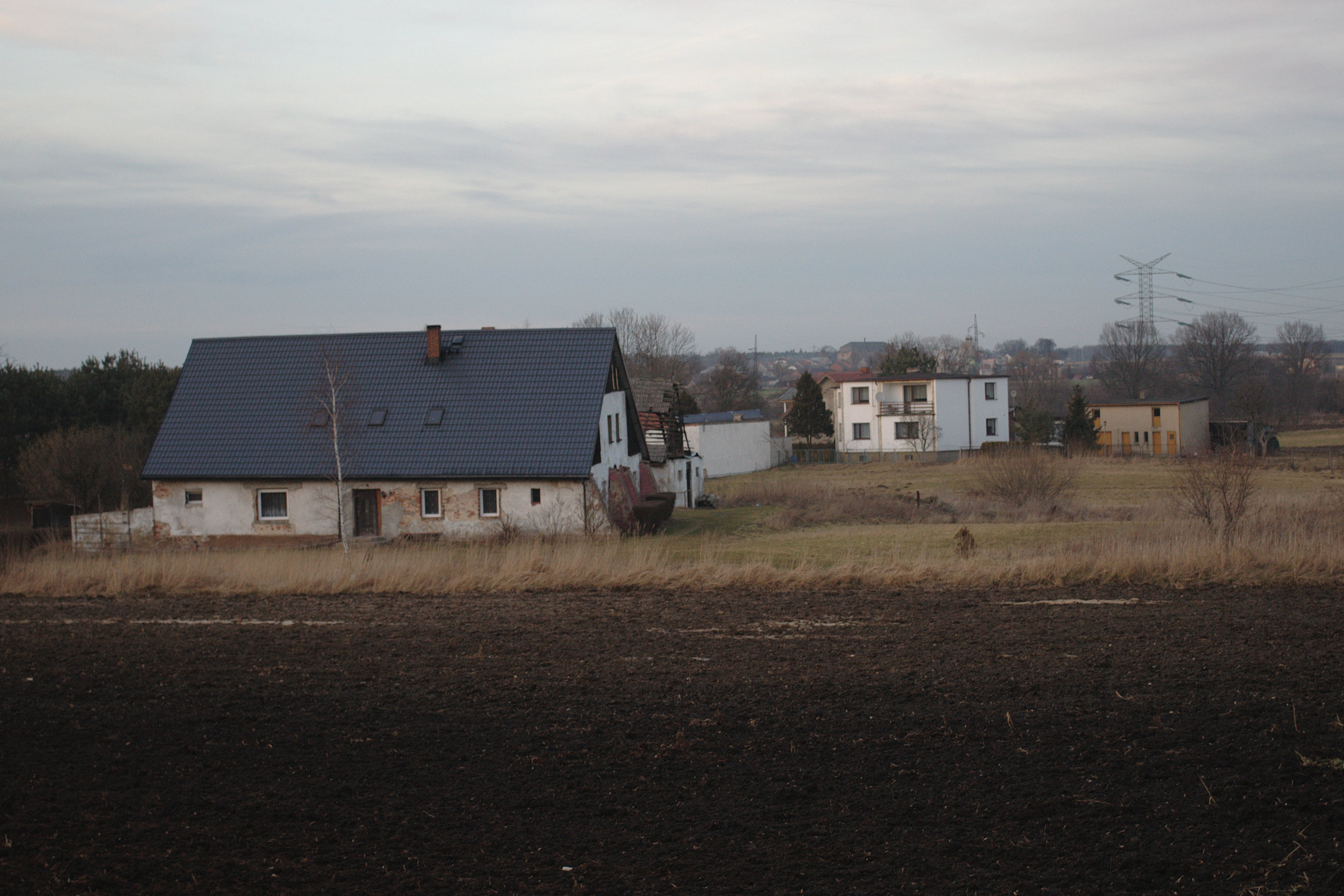

- Location within Poland
- Coordinates: 50°22′15″N 18°31′45″E
- Country: Poland
- Voivodeship: Silesian
- County: Gliwice
- Gmina: Rudziniec
- Elevation: 210 m (690 ft)
- Population (31 December 2021): 560

Taciszów [taˈt͡ɕiʂuf] is a village in the administrative district of Gmina Rudziniec, within Gliwice County, Silesian Voivodeship, in southern Poland.

Taciszów is home to a foundry known in Poland. There is a Catholic parish in the village (the parish church of St. Joseph the Worker) and a Camillian monastery.
