= Historic Silver Mine in Tarnowskie Góry =

UNESCO World Heritage Site
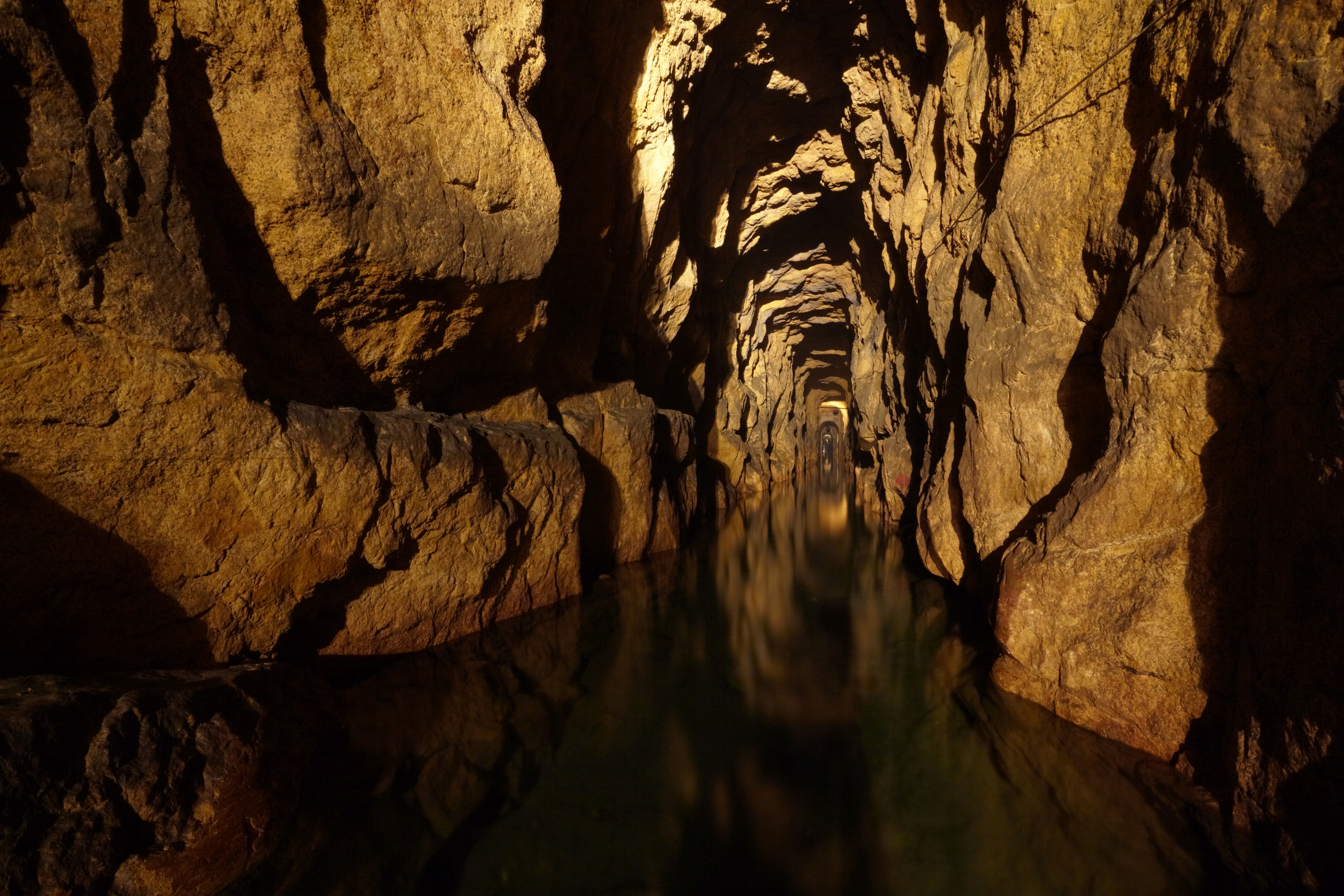

- Location within Silesian Voivodeship Location within Poland
- Official name: Tarnowskie Góry Lead-Silver-Zinc Mine and its Underground Water Management System
- Location: Tarnowskie Góry, Silesian Voivodeship, Poland
- Criteria: Cultural: (i)(ii)(iv)
- Reference: 1539
- Inscription: 2017 (41st Session)
- Area: 1,672.76 ha (4,133.5 acres)
- Buffer zone: 2,774.35 ha (6,855.6 acres)
- Website: www.kopalniasrebra.pl
- Coordinates: 50°25′31.79″N 18°50′58.43″E

Historic Monument of Poland
- Designated: 2004-04-14
- Reference no.: Dz. U. z 2004 r. Nr 102, poz. 1062

The Historic Silver Mine (Polish: Zabytkowa Kopalnia Srebra) is a UNESCO World Heritage Site (since 2017) in Tarnowskie Góry, Silesia, Poland. The mine and the neighbouring Black Trout Adit are remnants of a silver mining industry. The museum is an Anchor point on the European Route of Industrial Heritage. It also joined The International Committee for the Conservation of the Industrial Heritage and the Silesian Tourist Organization.

== History of mining ==
The region of Tarnowskie Góry – the adjective Tarnowskie came from the name of village Tarnowice (German: Alt Tarnowitz), a predecessor and now a part of the town; while the name Góry means "mountains", i.e. mining shafts and spoil tips around the town – is known for its historic lead ore mining. The ore mined here was galena, which is a source of lead and silver. Since the first quarter of the 16th century it became one of the most important industrial centres in East-Central Europe. After the town had been established in 1526, the last Duke of Opole Jan II the Good, together with Margrave George the Pious (in his capacity as the Duke of Krnov), granted it the status of an independent mining town. First generation of miners came here mainly from Franconia (from the areas of Ansbach and Bayreuth ruled by the Hohenzollern family of which the Duke George was a member) and were mostly German-speaking. Many miners were also a Czech origin – as they came to Tarnowskie Góry from Bohemia (from the Kutná Hora region). However, over time, the city began to Polonize.

The period of prosperity lasted until the end of the 16th century. In 17th century miners started to work at greater depths which created problems with water flooding the mine – the draining methods were not very efficient then. Thirty Years' War deepened the crisis even more. The industry collapsed, drainage equipment was destroyed. Epidemics and fires also plagued the town. Tarnowskie Góry was plundered by various armies (including Polish irregular cavalry troops, the Lisowczyks), and the cost of destruction and contributions had to be paid by the inhabitants.

Century later, most of Silesia region was conquered by the Kingdom of Prussia during the 1740–1748 Silesian Wars. King Frederick II delegated Friedrich Wilhelm von Reden and Friedrich Anton von Heynitz to resume mining activities in Silesia. Both of them were phenomenal professionals in the field of mining and metallurgy. In 1776 they both visited the largest English industrial centres, which in the second half of the 18th century were the forefront of European industry. There they learned the principles of operation of coal mines, coking plants, the use of steam engines, the construction of water channels and adits draining mining excavations.

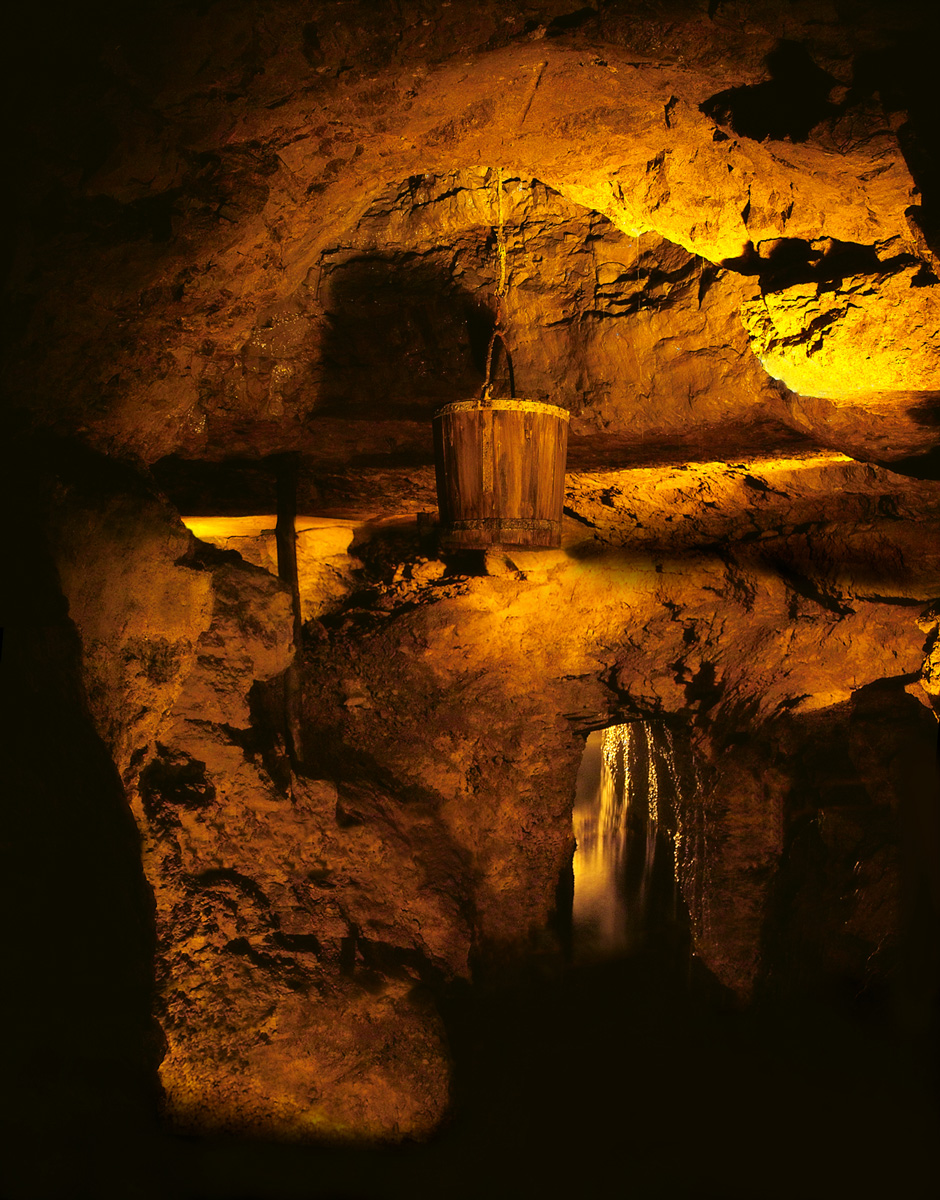
God Bless Shaft

The drilling of the shafts began in October 1783; 72 miners were involved in the work. After nine months of intensive work, on July 16, 1784, rich lead and silver ore deposit was found at a depth of 18 m in Rudolphine shaft. Two days later a similar discovery was made in the shaft Anton. The new state mine of silver and lead was given the name Frederick (Friedrichsgrube). The year of 1784 marked start of a new, industrial era of Tarnowskie Góry which lasted almost 130 years and brought to region of Upper Silesia significant wealth. Mining industry had to face the problem of water flooding the excavations. Horse treadmills were not able to drain the mine fast enough. In 1787 a steam engine was brought from Wales by Count von Reden, the first one installed in whole Continental Europe. The machine started to work on January 19, 1788. Water was drained from the excavations and rich deposits of ore could be mined. Thanks to steam engines, digging of the draining adit was also possible which finally led to removing the water from the mine without help of any additional devices.

Due to the depletion of galena ore, the mine began to gradually cease its activity at the beginning of the 20th century, definitively terminating its activity in 1913. For four centuries miners dug over 20,000 shafts and over 150 kilometers of underground corridors.

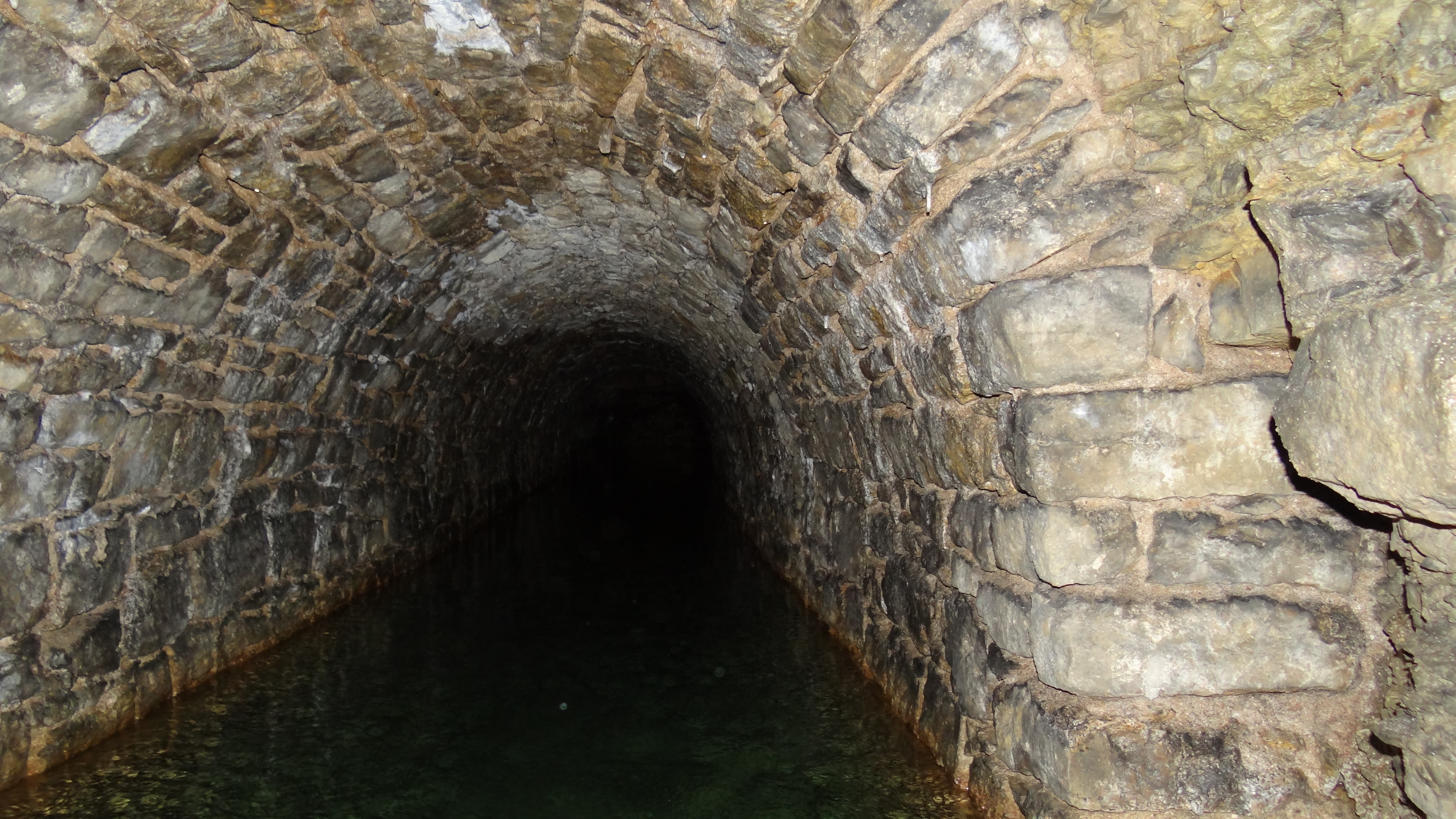
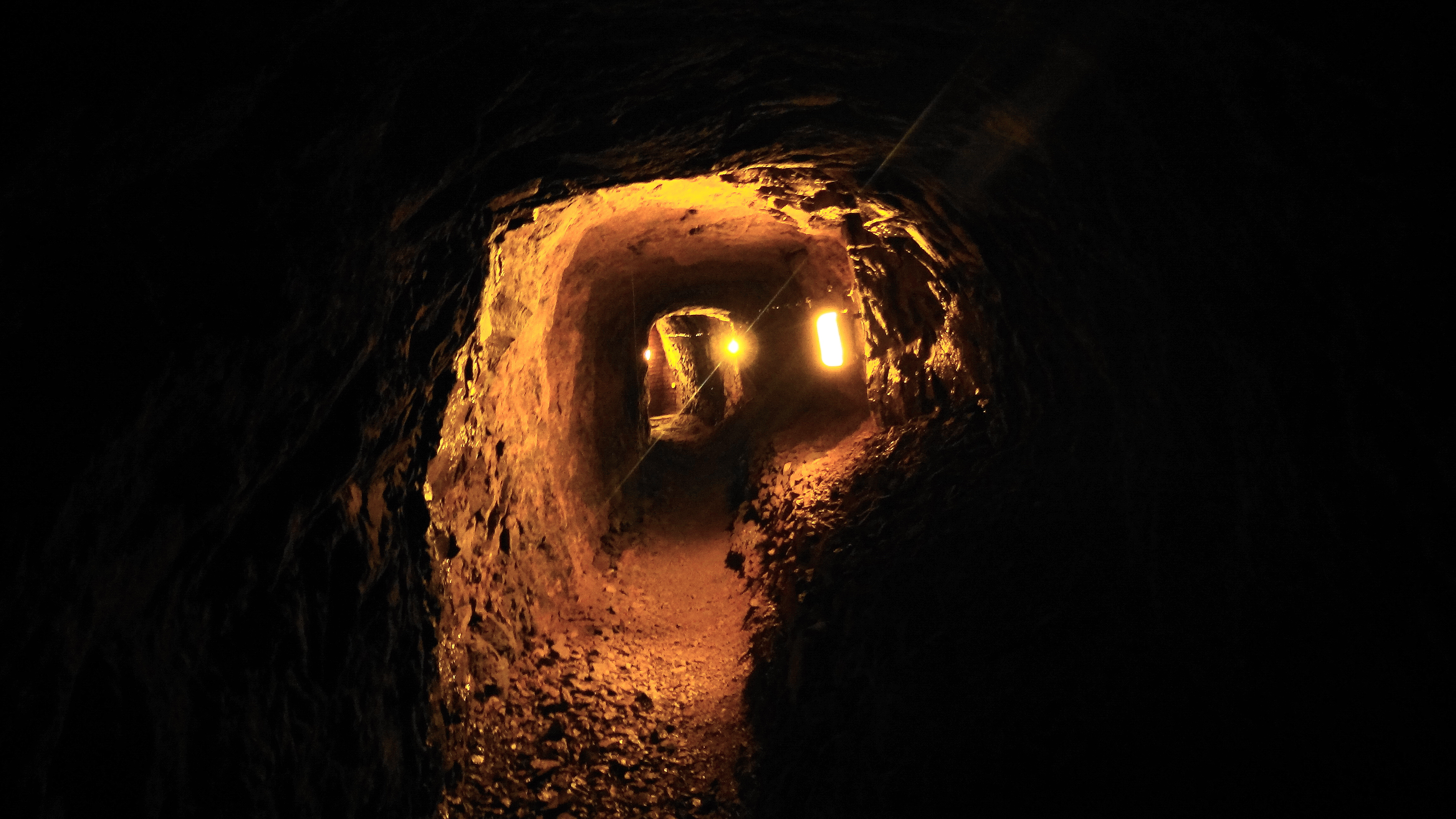
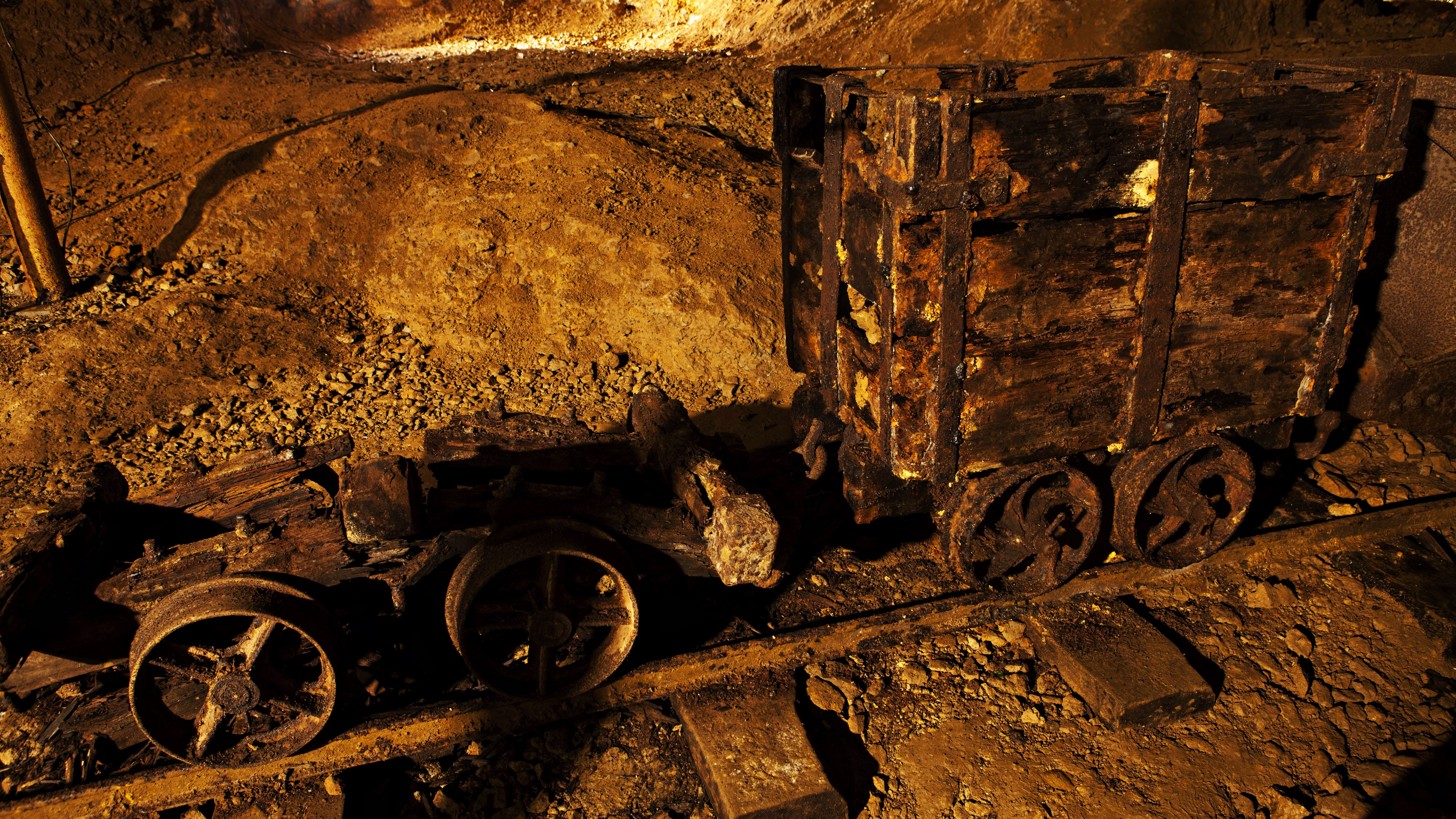
Historic Silver Mine today

== History of tourism and UNESCO Heritage Site ==
Researchers, scientists and history enthusiasts started to explore vast chambers and corridors left by miners more than 20 years ago. The first attempts to choose a fragment of the mine suitable for tourists were undertaken in the mid-1930s. Unfortunately the outbreak of World War II stopped the implementation of any projects.

In the 1950s a group of history enthusiasts founded Tarnowskie Góry Land Lovers Association, their main goal was to open a tourist route. Black Trout Adit - a part of the drainage system - was opened in 1957 and for decades was the longest underground boat tour in Poland. It was more difficult to create a safe route in a corridors of the mine itself. Finally the route between shafts: Angel, God Bless and Viper was opened for tourists on September 5, 1976.

In 2004 the president of Poland declared the mine a Historic Monument. Since 2006 it is a part of Silesian Industrial Monuments Route. In 2014 the mine became a part of the European Route of Industrial Heritage.

During 41st session of the World Heritage Committee on July 9, 2017, in Cracow, Poland, Historic Silver Mine and its Underground Management System was inscribed to the UNESCO Heritage List.

== Historic Silver Mine today ==
The mine is normally open for tourists, and guided tours in several languages take place every day (visits in languages other than Polish must be booked in advance). The tour starts in a museum and then tourists go underground to visit the corridors from the 18th and 19th centuries. The total length of the route is 1.7 km, with 270 metres crossed in boats through the flooded corridor.

Open Air Steam Engine Museum surrounds the mine building, where children can have a ride on a small narrow-gauge railway.

== See also ==
- Spoil tip in Tarnowskie Góry
- Silver Mountain (Srebrna Góra)
