= Sucha Góra, Bytom =

District of the town of Bytom

Sucha Góra Trockenbarg
- Bytom District
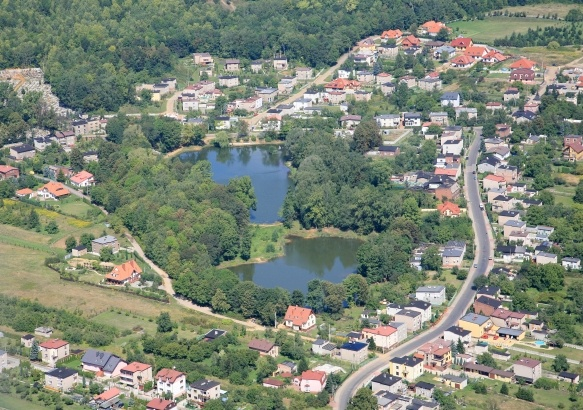
- Birds eye view of Sucha Góra, Bytom.

- Location of Sucha Góra within Bytom.
- Country: Poland
- Voivodeship: Silesian
- County/City: Bytom

Area
  - Total: 507 km^{2} (196 sq mi)

Population
  - Total: 3,700
  - Density: 7.3/km^{2} (19/sq mi)
- Time zone: UTC+1 (CET)
  - Summer (DST): UTC+2 (CEST)
- Postal code: 41-935

Sucha Góra (Lower Silesian: Trockenbarg; German: Trockenberg, see also other names) is the northernmost district of Bytom, Poland (from 1975; formerly a district of Radzionków and prior to that its own municipality).

== History ==
Sucha Góra was established as a mining colony of Piekary Rudne (Now a part of Tarnowskie Góry) in 1778. Calamine and Dolomite were mined in Sucha Góra.

In 1922, Sucha Góra became a part of Poland following the Upper Silesian Plebiscite, in which 696 people voted to join Poland in Sucha Góra and 116 people voted to remain within Germany.

From 1972 to 1975, Sucha Góra was a district of Radzionków. In 1975 Sucha Góra became a district of Bytom.

== Etymology and other names ==
Sucha Góra means "dry mountain" in Polish.
The town is known as "Trockenberg" in German and as "Trockenbarg" in Silesian German.

In the Alphabetical List of Settlements in Silesia given out in 1830 by Johann Georg published in Breslau (Polish: Wrocław), Sucha Góra is listed in German as "Trockenberg" and in Polish as "Suchogóra".

== Sources ==
- "Bytom – Sucha Góra". slaskiemiasta.pl. Retrieved October 6, 2020.
- Wyniki plebiscytu na Górnym Śląsku. Dziewulski, Stefan. Warszawa 1922.
