= Black Trout Adit =

- Sztolnia Czarnego Pstrąga (Polish)
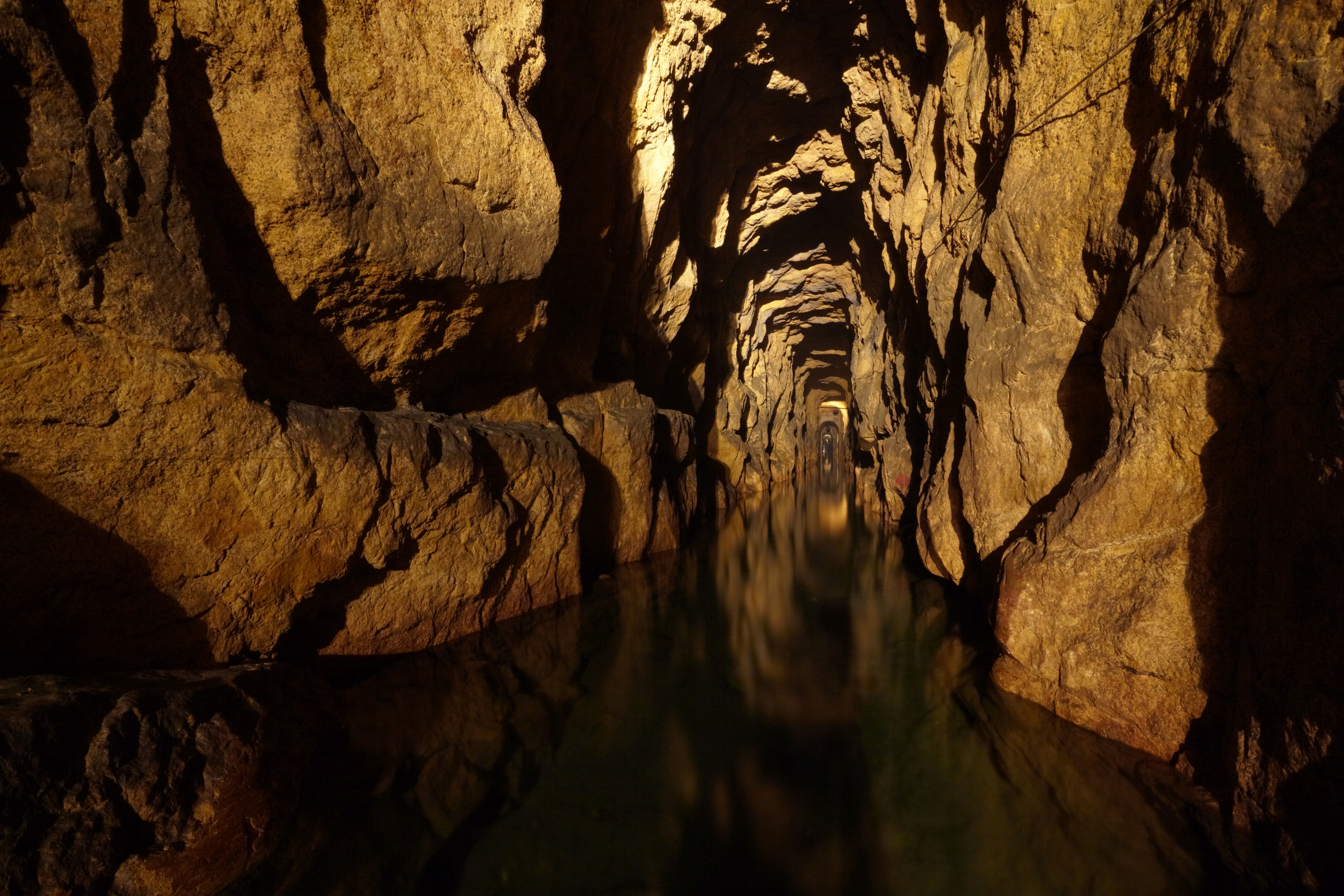
- Adit

- Location within Poland
- 50.4303°N 18.8006°E
- Type: adit
- Location: Tarnowskie Góry, Poland

Historic Monument of Poland
- Designated: 2004-04-14
- Reference no.: Dz. U. z 2004 r. Nr 102, poz. 1062

Black Trout Adit (Polish: Sztolnia Czarnego Pstrąga) is the longest (600 meters) underground tourist route in Poland travelled by boats. It's a part of one of 8 adits dug in the area to drain the workings. The Black Trout Adit is located in a park in the west of the town Tarnowskie Góry. Access is by two shafts Ewa and Sylwester (the traffic is alternating). The guide puts the boats in motion and tells the stories connected with the place.

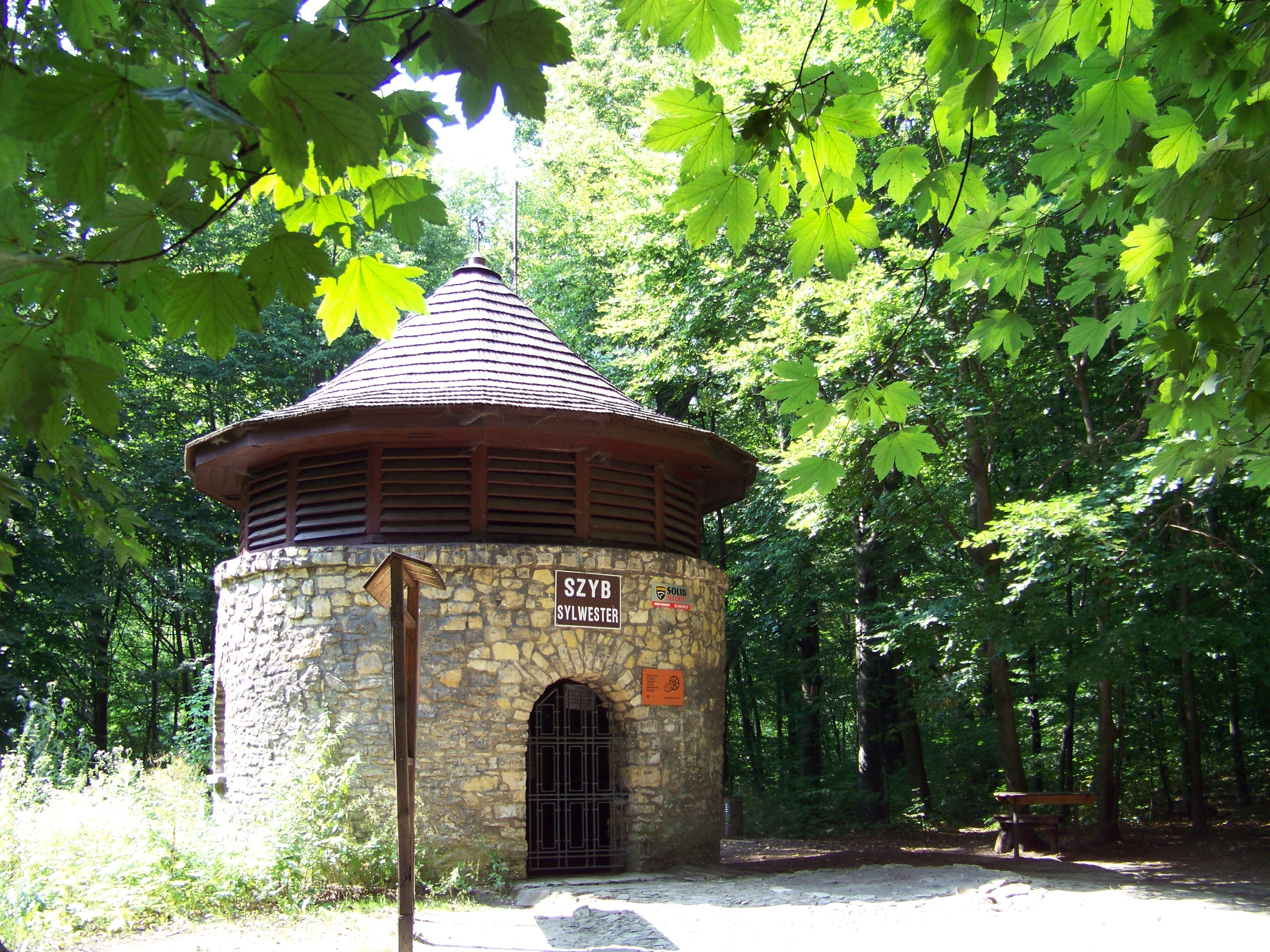
Entrance in Sylwester shaft

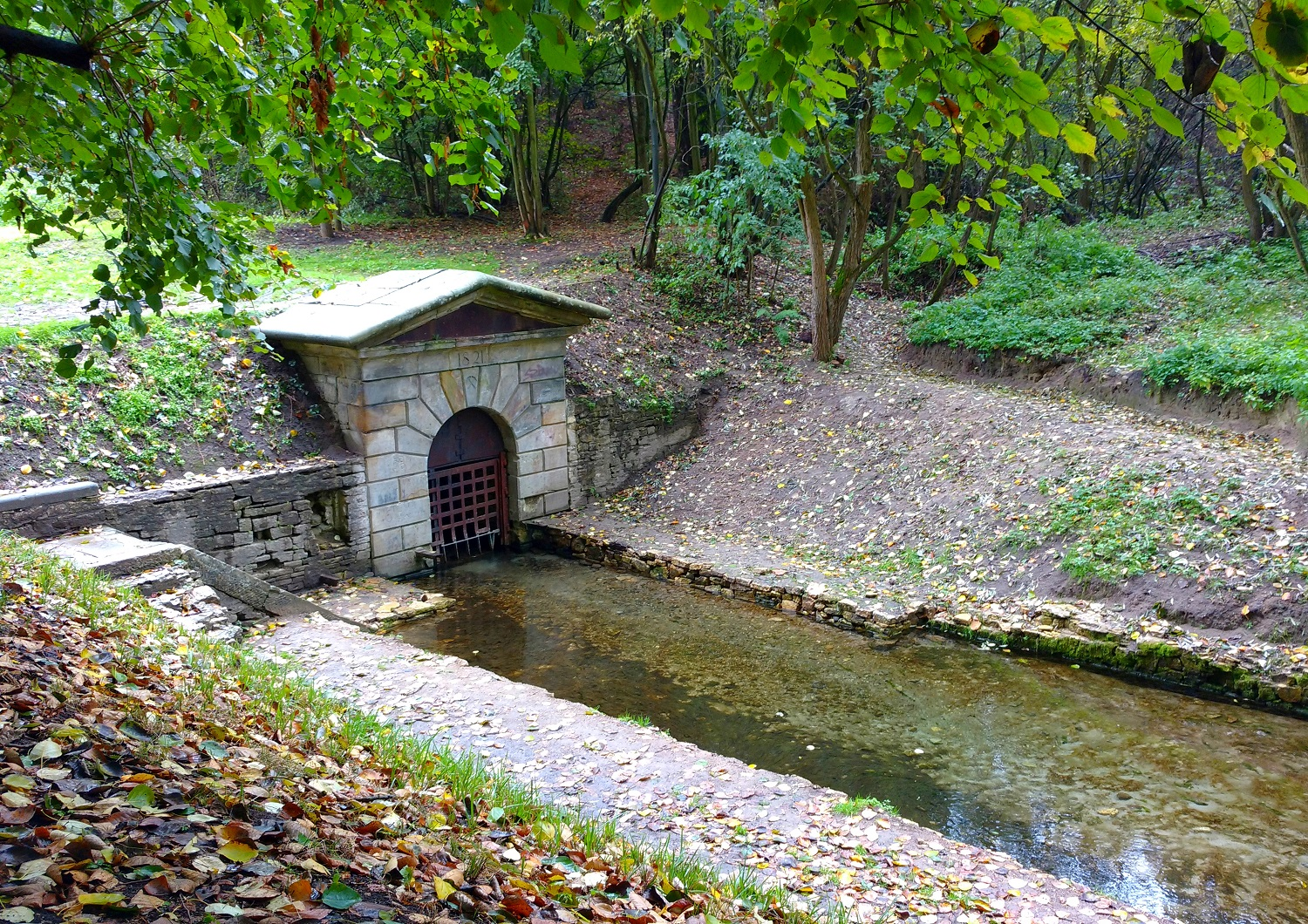
Portal and ditch of the Adit

== History ==
The region of Tarnowskie Góry is known for historic lead ore mining. The lead ores contains a large admixture of silver. Beginning in 1526 when new deposits of lead (mostly galena) were found, the settlement started to grow quickly. In 1526 Jan II the Good the Duke of Opole granted the community the status of an independent mining town. The name of the town Tarnowskie Góry has a mining genesis. The first part "Tarnowskie" comes from the name of village "Tarnowice" where deposits of lead enriched by silver were found. Currently Tarnowice (actually Stare Tarnowice) is a district of Tarnowskie Góry. The second part of the name "Góry", the old-Polish dialect word for "mines". Current meaning of the word "Góry" is "mountains" and may be confusing. Mining industry had to wrestle with the problem of water flooding workings. To prevent it in 1788 the first steam engine was brought from England by Fryderyk Wilhelm Hrabia von Reden. The other way to drain workings was digging adits which piped the water using the difference of level. There were 8 adits in Tarnowskie Góry. A 600-meter part of former "Fryderyk" adit, built in 1821-1834, is available for tourists. The lead-ore mining in Tarnowskie Góry stopped in 1912 because of resource shortage. However a huge amount of past mining traces is left, both underground and overground.

The tourist route was opened in 1957. Due to terrain profile, the route is located 20 to 30 m underground, and is 600 m long. Access is by two shafts with staircases: 30-metre deep "Sylwester" (Sylvester) built in 1828 and 20-metre deep "Ewa" (Eve) built in 1826. Its current name Black Trout Adit came from trouts, that used to penetrate the adit from a river, seeming black in dim lights. Width of the adit varies from 1.2 m to 2.5 m, height to 4 m, water depth from 0.7 m to 1 m. The tourists travel in boat trains, pushed forward by guides.

The Historic Silver Mine is also nearby.
