= Repty Park =

19th-century landscape park in Poland

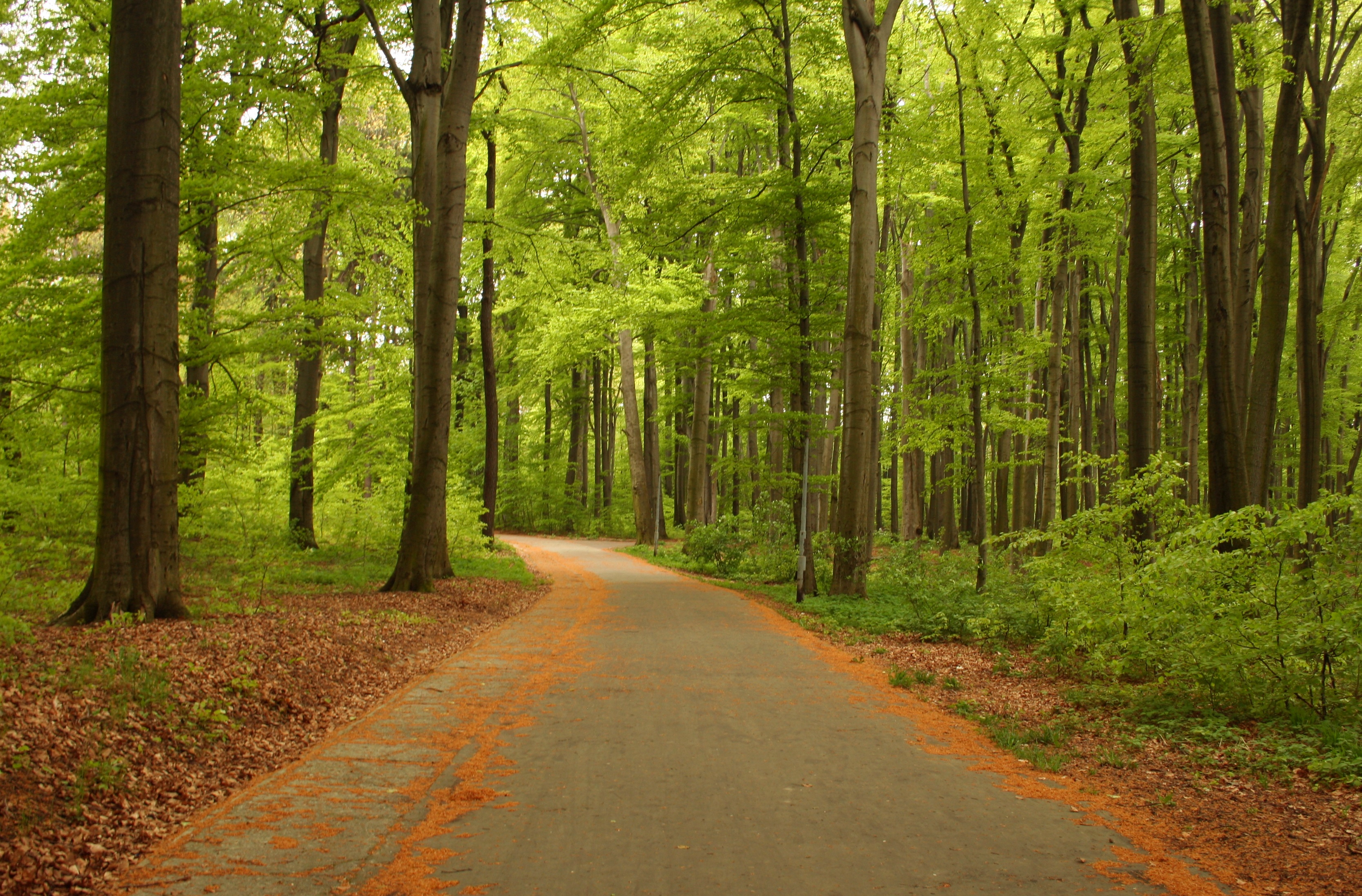
- Pathway in the Repty Park (2008)
- Interactive map of Repty Park
- Location: Tarnowskie Góry (Repty Śląskie district); Gmina Zbrosławice (Ptakowice); Poland
- Coordinates: 50°25′43″N 18°48′24″E
- Area: 200 ha (490 acres)
- Established: 1840s (game preserve) late 19th century (English landscape garden)

Repty Park, also known as Repecki Park (German: Reptener Park, Reptener Tiergarten) is a 19th-century landscape park covering approximately 200 hectares, located within the city of Tarnowskie Góry and a small portion of Gmina Zbrosławice, Poland. Most of its area was inscribed in the register of immovable historic monuments in December 1966. It forms part of the nature and landscape complex named Repty Park and Drama River Valley.

The park's current grounds were once covered by deciduous forest. In 1824, Count Carl Lazarus Henckel von Donnersmarck purchased the village of Repty and its surrounding estates, establishing a game preserve in a section of forest north of the village. Between 1893 and 1898, a Renaissance Revival palace was built in its central area, and the preserve was transformed into an English-style park. After World War I, the park became part of Poland; following World War II, it was nationalized. In the 1960s, the palace was demolished, replaced by the Upper Silesian Rehabilitation Center. Most of the park is now forested.

The park is divided into two sections by the northwest-flowing Drama river. It preserves forest communities of beechwoods, hornbeam-oak forests, and riparian forests, alongside patches of wet meadows and reed beds. The park is home to several protected plant and animal species, rare bat species, and numerous breeding bird species.

== History ==
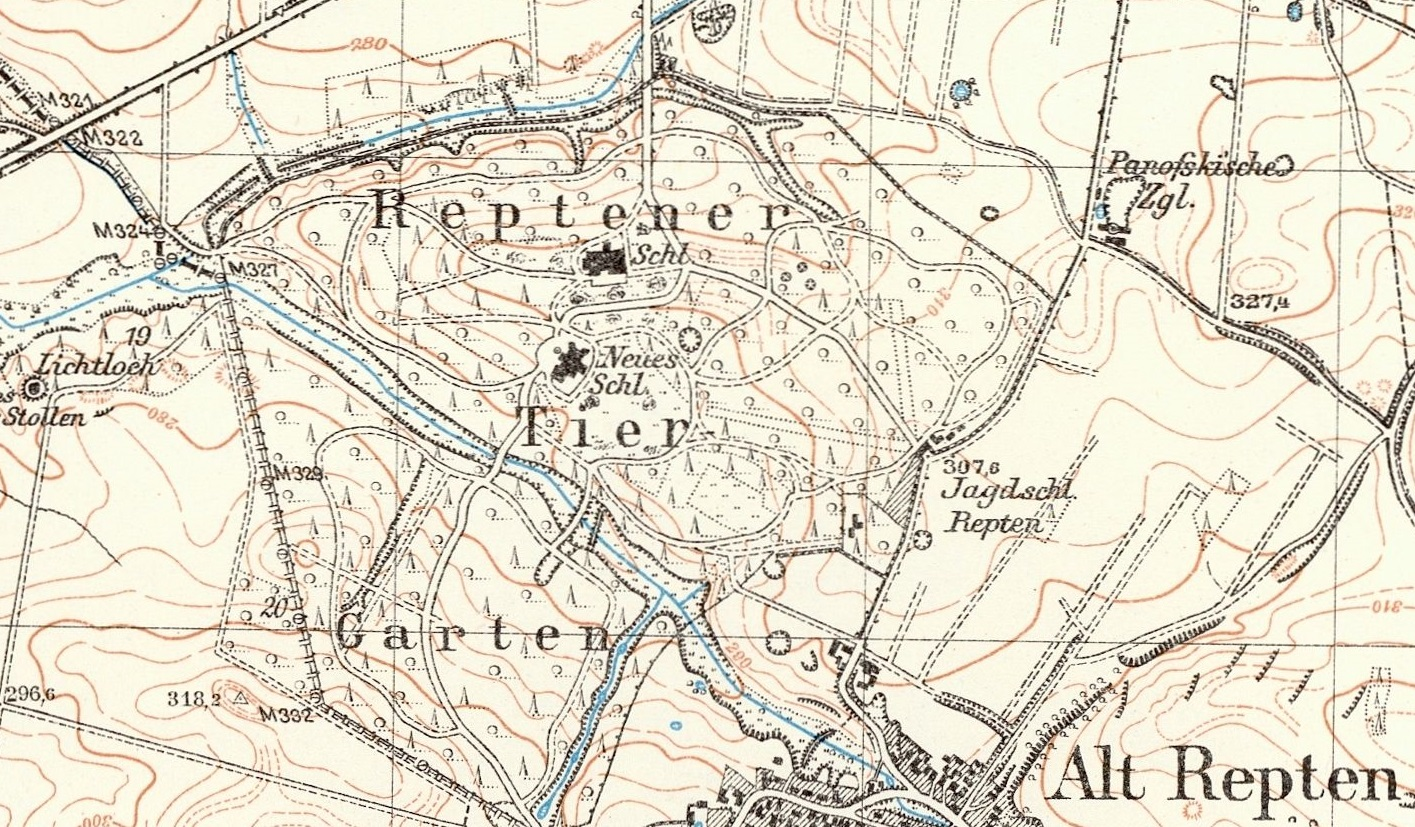
Repty hunting preserve (Reptener Tier-Garten) on a fragment of a 1933 German map of Upper Silesia, based on an 1883 Prussian map

The beech-oak forests (remnants of which form the modern park) and hornbeam-oak forests covered the area around Repty as early as the Middle Ages. By the end of this period, only the highest hilltops and nappes with infertile sand, glacial gravel, and dolomite scree remained forested, while arable fields were established elsewhere. Despite its fertile loess soils, the park's land was not converted to farmland, likely serving as a communal forest for the settlement's residents due to its proximity and tree composition.

In 1824, Count Carl Lazarus Henckel von Donnersmarck of Świerklaniec acquired the Repty estates, including the park's current area, from the heirs of the Larisch family, former village owners. On the eastern edge of the existing forest, atop a hill along the road from Stare Tarnowice to Repty (now Repecka Street), he built a small hunting lodge (German: Jagdschloss Repten) in the 1840s. The forest was converted into a hunting preserve (German: Reptener Tiergarten), enclosed by a limestone wall (parts of which survive today), stocked with deer and pheasants. To facilitate hunting, the central and northern forest sections were cleared, and a wide path was cut for shooting directly from the lodge.

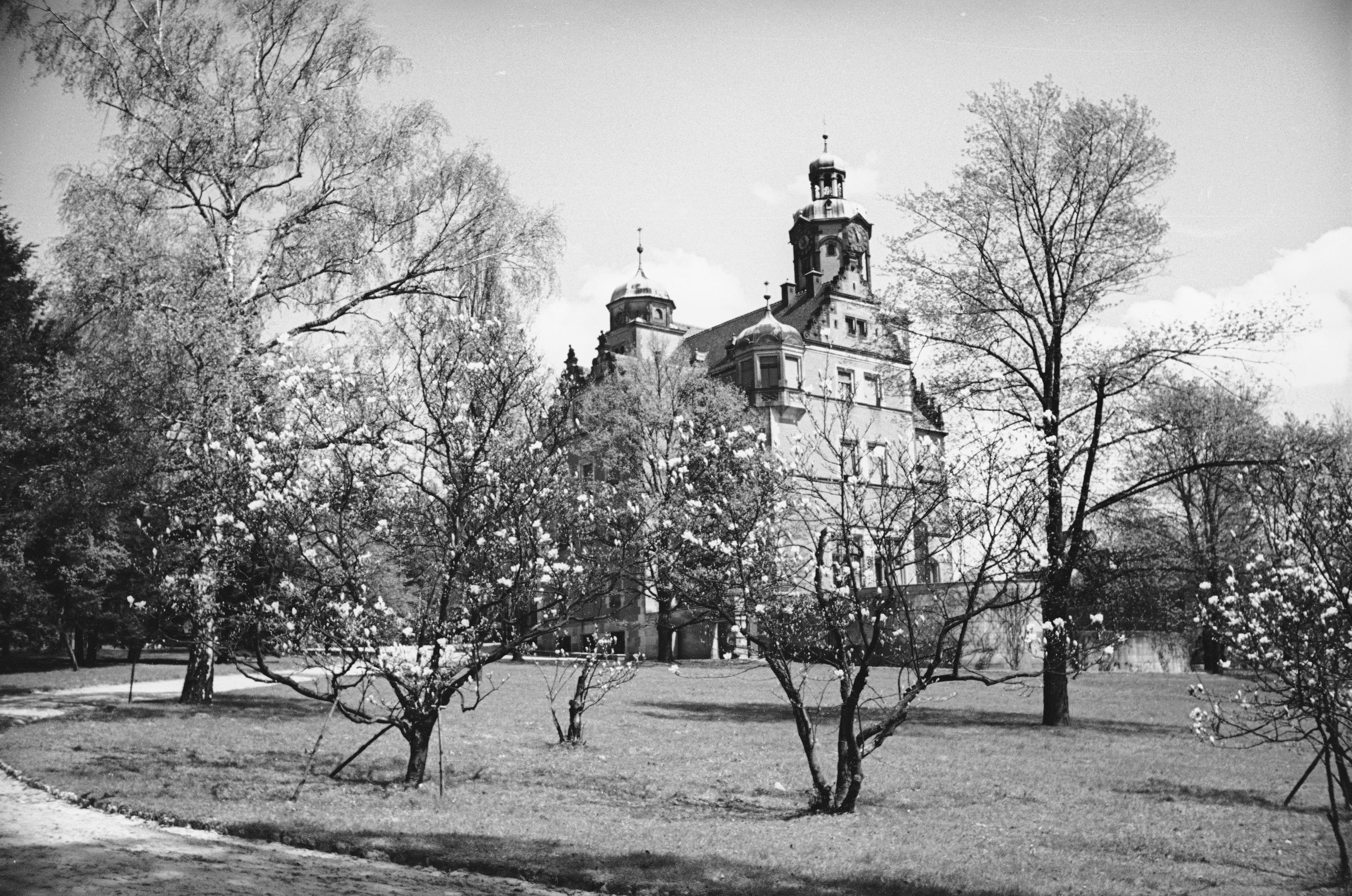
Donnersmarck Palace in Repty and surrounding vegetation (1937)

In 1893, Karol's son, Guido, began constructing a grand palace in the preserve's center, designed in the German Renaissance Revival style by renowned Munich architect Gabriel von Seidl. The preserve was reimagined as a residential English landscape garden (Reptener Park). This involved moving hundreds of thousands of cubic meters of earth, flattening and rounding hills, filling valleys, and leveling elevation differences. A forest section along the Drama river (Repecki Ditch) was cleared to create meadows, maintained today by regular mowing. Approximately 10,000 trees, mostly beeches and oaks, were planted to enhance the existing stands, alongside exotic species from North America and East Asia, including eastern hemlock, Douglas fir, Sawara cypress, eastern white pine, three oak species (northern red, Hungarian, and pin), four maple species (silver, fullmoon, striped, sugar), tulip tree, and cucumber tree. The design ensured a gradual transition from the man-made park near the palace to natural forest and meadows farther out.

After Guido's death in 1916, his younger son, Kraft, inherited the estate. In 1922, the new German-Polish border was drawn along the park's western edge, placing it in Poland. Kraft, a patron of the Rifles Brotherhood of Tarnowskie Góry, remained the owner and often hosted shooting events, attended by his brother Guidotto and Guidotto's sons, Guido and Karol Erdmann. During World War II, the palace was burned down, and its ruins were demolished in the 1960s. The park was nationalized and managed by the State Forests. Between 1966 and 1975, the Upper Silesian Rehabilitation Center Repty, named after General Jerzy Ziętek, was built on a large clearing near the former palace site. The unused hunting lodge on the eastern edge fell into ruin and was demolished in 1971, replaced by a parking lot.

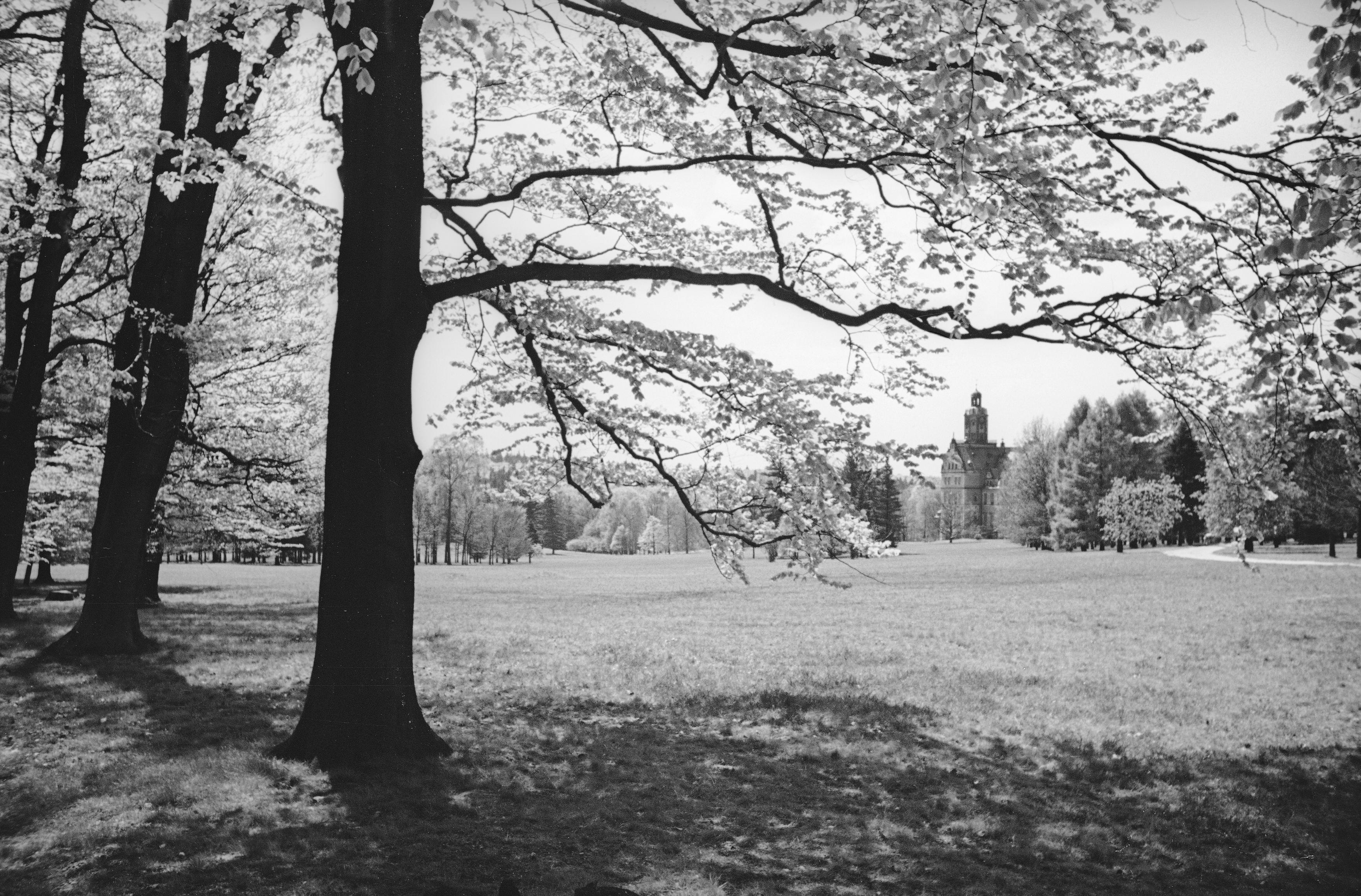
Large clearing beside the palace (visible on the right; 1937)

The Rehabilitation Center managed the park until the early 1990s, when it was returned to the state treasury. Today, Tarnowskie Góry owns most of the park, with a 17-hectare central section still under Rehabilitation Center's administration. Since 1999, the former palace stables and adjacent buildings, once part of the Vocational Rehabilitation Facility for the Disabled within the Rehabilitation Center, have been owned by the Salesians of Don Bosco and Salesian Sisters of Don Bosco, who operate a school complex, healthcare facility, and occupational therapy workshops.

Between 2004 and 2006, the Rehabilitation Center and the Katowice Voivodeship Fund for Environmental Protection and Water Management established a nature-educational trail with 18 panels (originally 20), placed along pathways around the Rehabilitation Center and renovated in 2019. From 2017 to 2019, the Rehabilitation Center building was expanded with an additional pavilion.

In December 1966, Repty Park was added to the register of historic monuments (No. A/660/66). In 1996, a natural valuation of Tarnowskie Góry identified the park as ecologically valuable area No. 34, initiating protection efforts. In November 1998, Katowice Voivodeship Ordinance No. 31/98 designated the park and adjacent agricultural lands on the Tarnowskie Góry-Zbrosławice border as the Repty Park and Drama River Valley nature and landscape complex, spanning 481.46 hectares. In July 2002, Silesian Voivodeship Ordinance No. 46/02 redefined it as 475.51 hectares – 233.63 hectares in Tarnowskie Góry and 241.88 hectares in Gmina Zbrosławice.

In 2012, Aktualizacja waloryzacji przyrodniczej miasta Tarnowskie Góry reexamined the park, documenting its valuable plant communities, fauna, and flora.

== Location and layout ==
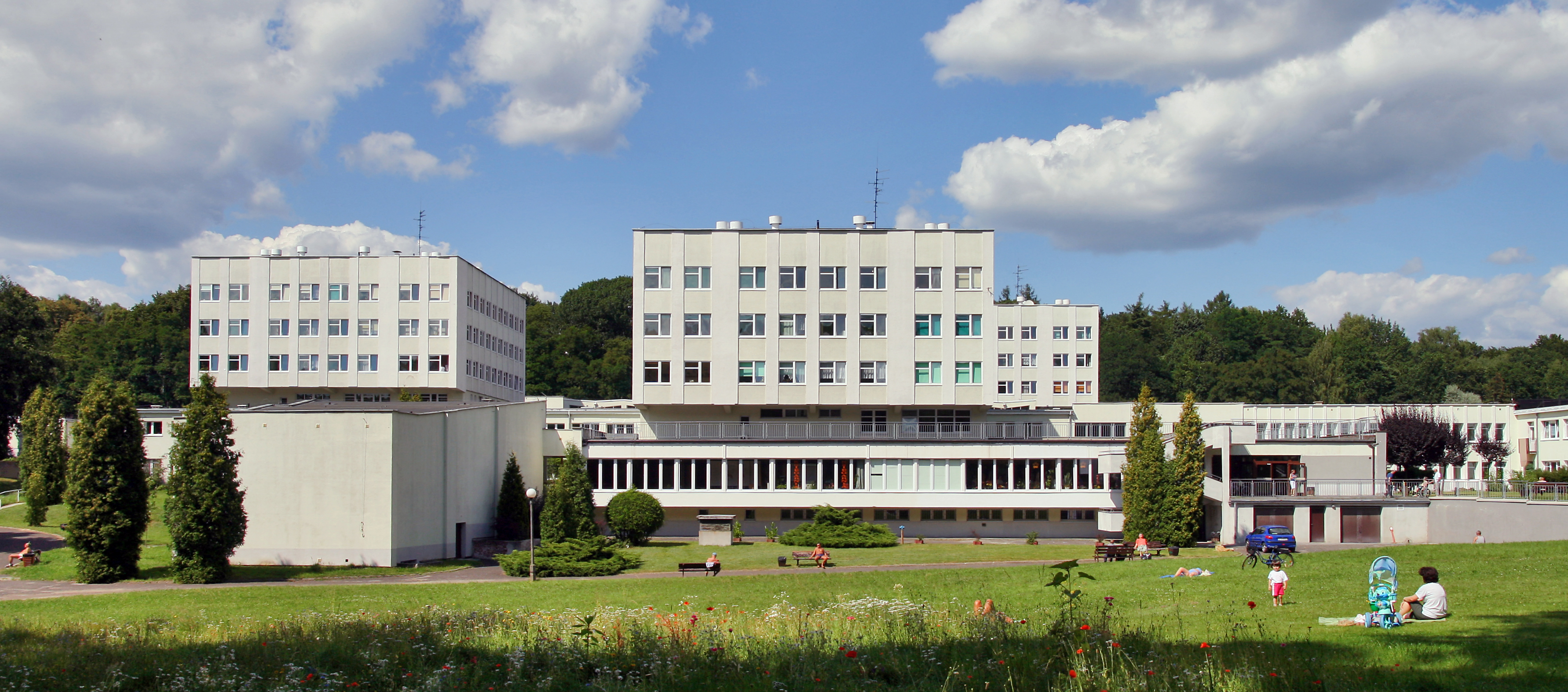
Upper Silesian Rehabilitation Center Repty in the park's central area (2009)

Most of Repty Park lies in the southwestern part of Tarnowskie Góry, within the Repty Śląskie district, with a roughly 6-hectare section in the eastern part of Gmina Zbrosławice, in the Ptakowice village. Access is via Repecka Street from the east and Śniadecki Street from the north. A balloon loop named "Stare Tarnowice GCR" in the park's center serves bus lines 3, 135, 142, 614, and 780 (as of September 2022), operated by the Metropolitan Transport Authority, connecting the park to Tarnowskie Góry districts (Śródmieście-Centrum, Osada Jana, Strzybnica, Rybna), and nearby Bytom, Miasteczko Śląskie, Gmina Świerklaniec, and Piekary Śląskie.

Originally, the park featured a clear landscape design with oval scenic paths and a recreational clearing near the palace. Today, the central area has partly lost its form due to the Rehabilitation Center's construction, but the historic path network, including a buckeye alley linking Stare Tarnowice to Stare Repty, remains intact, supplemented by additional trails.

== Nature ==
=== Hydrology ===
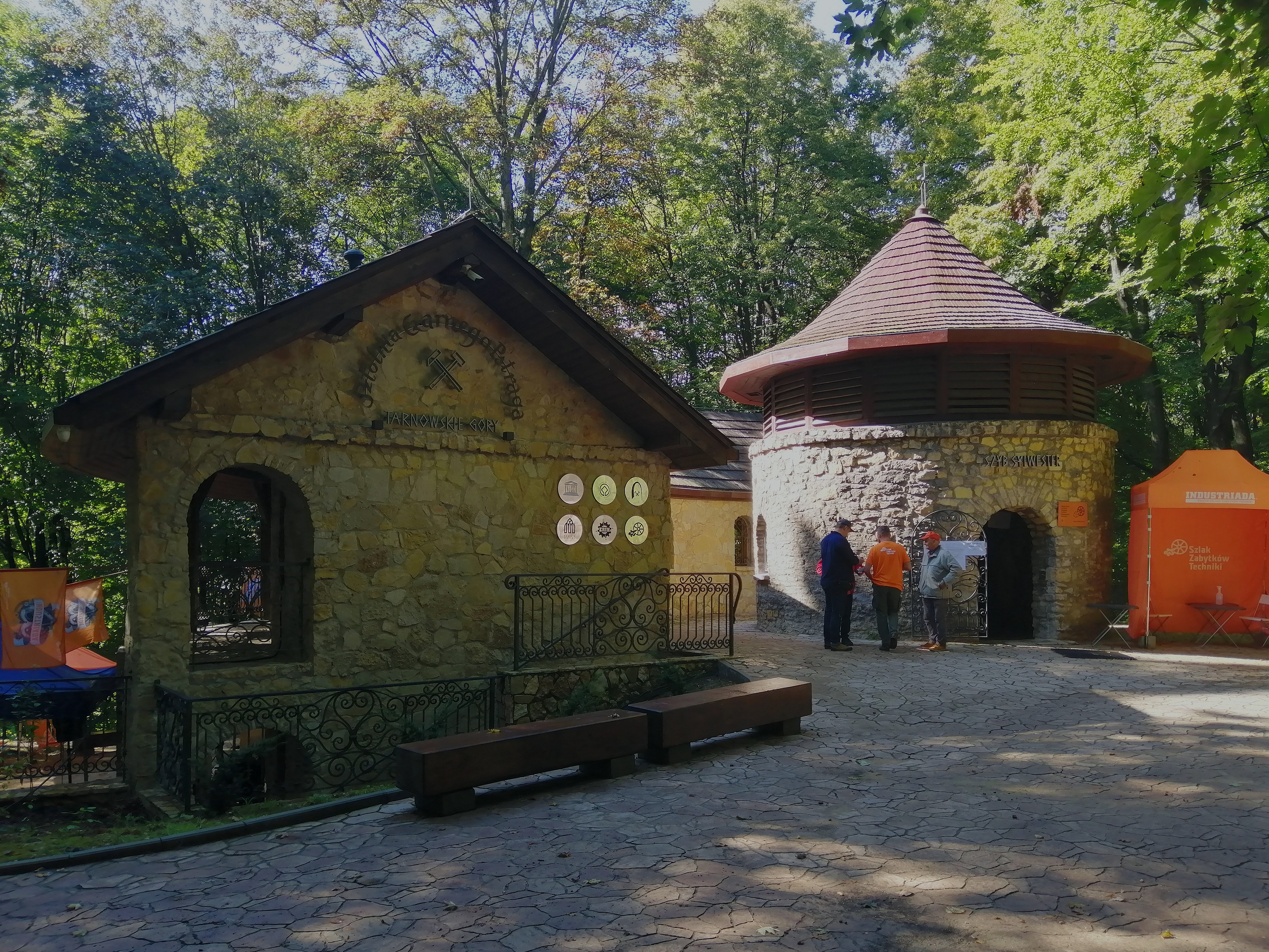
Sylwester shaft of Black Trout Adit in the park (right) with the new tourist facility (2020)

The Drama river (locally Repecki Ditch) flows through the park's center, dividing it into a northeastern section – the main landscape park shaped in the late 19th century – and a southwestern section, remnants of the former hunting preserve near Mikołaj Hill (318 meters above sea level).

The only active tributary within the park is Mikołuszka (or Lecynoga), flowing through a deep ravine from near St. Nicholas Church. It once fed five ponds, two of which remain. The park's northwestern boundary is marked by Starotarnowicki Stream, a right Drama tributary. Beneath the park runs the 1821–1834 Deep Friedrich Adit (Tiefer-Friedrich-Stollen), with a 600-meter section open since 1957 as the Black Trout Adit, accessible via the Sylwester (30-meter depth) and Ewa (20-meter depth) shafts within the park. In September 2020, a two-story tourist facility with a terrace overlooking the Drama valley – housing a visitor center, souvenir shop, educational room, and restrooms – was opened near the Sylwester shaft, styled to match the shaft's headframe.

=== Geology ===
Geologically, the park splits into two zones: the southwestern section overlies an outcrop of ore-bearing dolomite covered by thick, reshaped glacial moraine deposits and a kame hill (Mikołaj Hill), while the northeastern and central areas rest on light gray marly dolomite outcrops (stratigraphic Tarnowice layers) forming an east-west elongated hill with a diluvium cover. Physico-geographically, it lies within the Tarnowskie Góry Ridge, a mesoregion of the Silesian Upland.

=== Vegetation ===
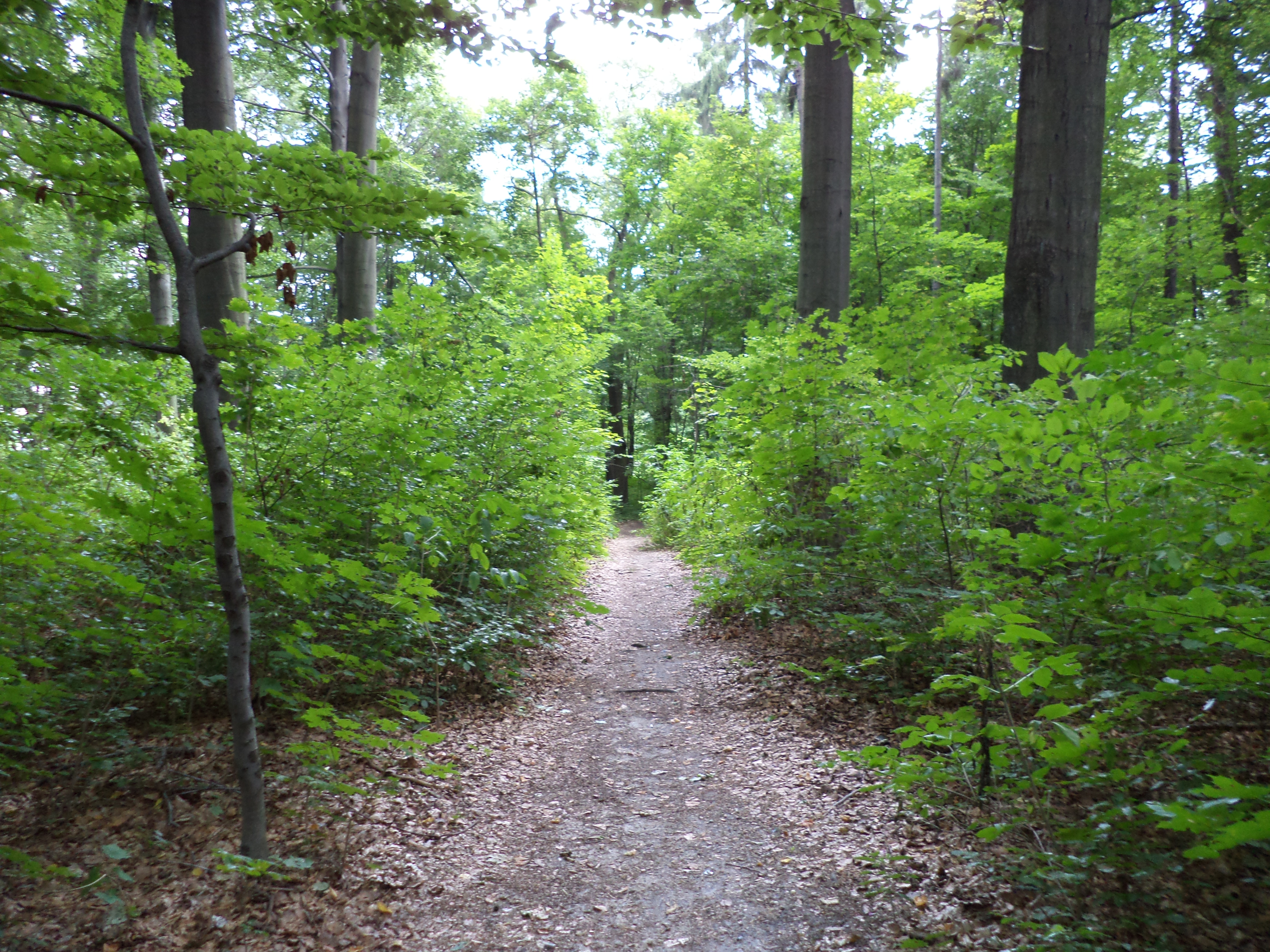
Forest path in the park (2013)

The park hosts several plant communities, predominantly forest types. The central area features a degraded form of fertile lowland beech forest (Galio odorati-Fagetum), with well-preserved 150–170-year-old tree stands dominated by beech with pedunculate oak, hornbeam, and sparse spruce. The sparse shrub layer includes wild elder, red-berried elder, rowan, and spindle. The ground layer features typical species like wood melick, plus wood sedge, yellow archangel, mountain melick, dog's mercury, Solomon's seal, unspotted lungwort, and figwort.

The western and northern edges host acid lowland beech forest (Luzulo pilosae-Fagetum), with beeches and occasional pedunculate oaks in the canopy, and elder and rowan saplings in the understory. The ground layer includes European blueberry, chickweed-wintergreen (Trientalis europaea), hairy wood-rush, and wavy hair-grass. In 2012, wood anemone was recorded.

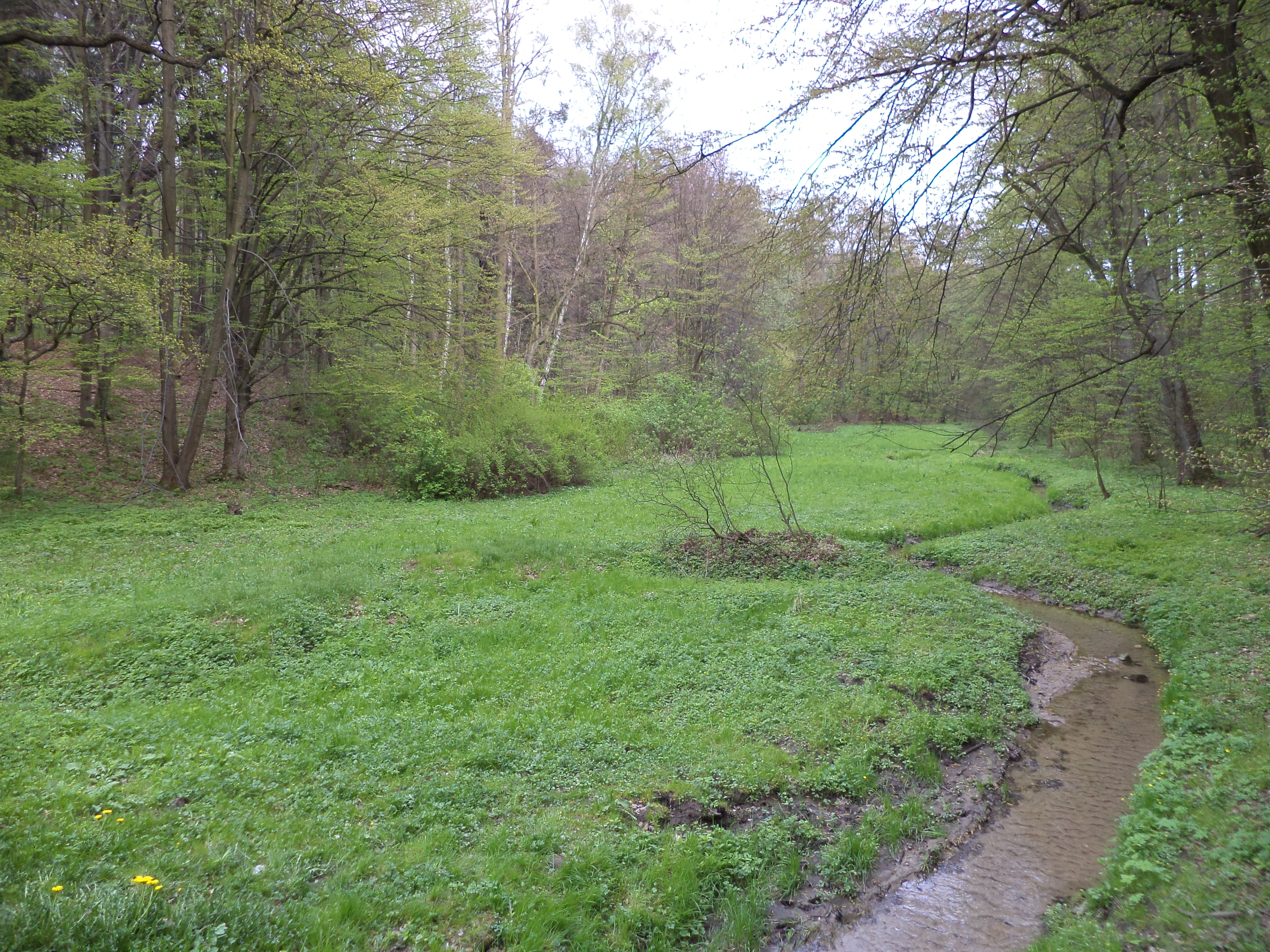
Meandering Drama river through the park (2016)

Depressions and the Drama river (Repecki Ditch) slopes support hornbeam-oak forests (Carpinion betuli): subcontinental hornbeam-oak forest (Tilio-Carpinetum) and Central European hornbeam-oak forest (Galio sylvatici-Carpinetum). The canopy comprises common hornbeam, small-leaved lime, and pedunculate oak, with occasional beeches, spruces, pines, and maples. The shrub layer mirrors fertile beechwoods with rowan, black elder, spindle, and added common hazel. Ground cover includes broad-leaved enchanter's nightshade, early dog-violet, male fern, American milletgrass, wood bluegrass, greater stitchwort, ground elder, yellow star-of-Bethlehem, lesser celandine, Scotch mist and Melampyrum nemorosum.

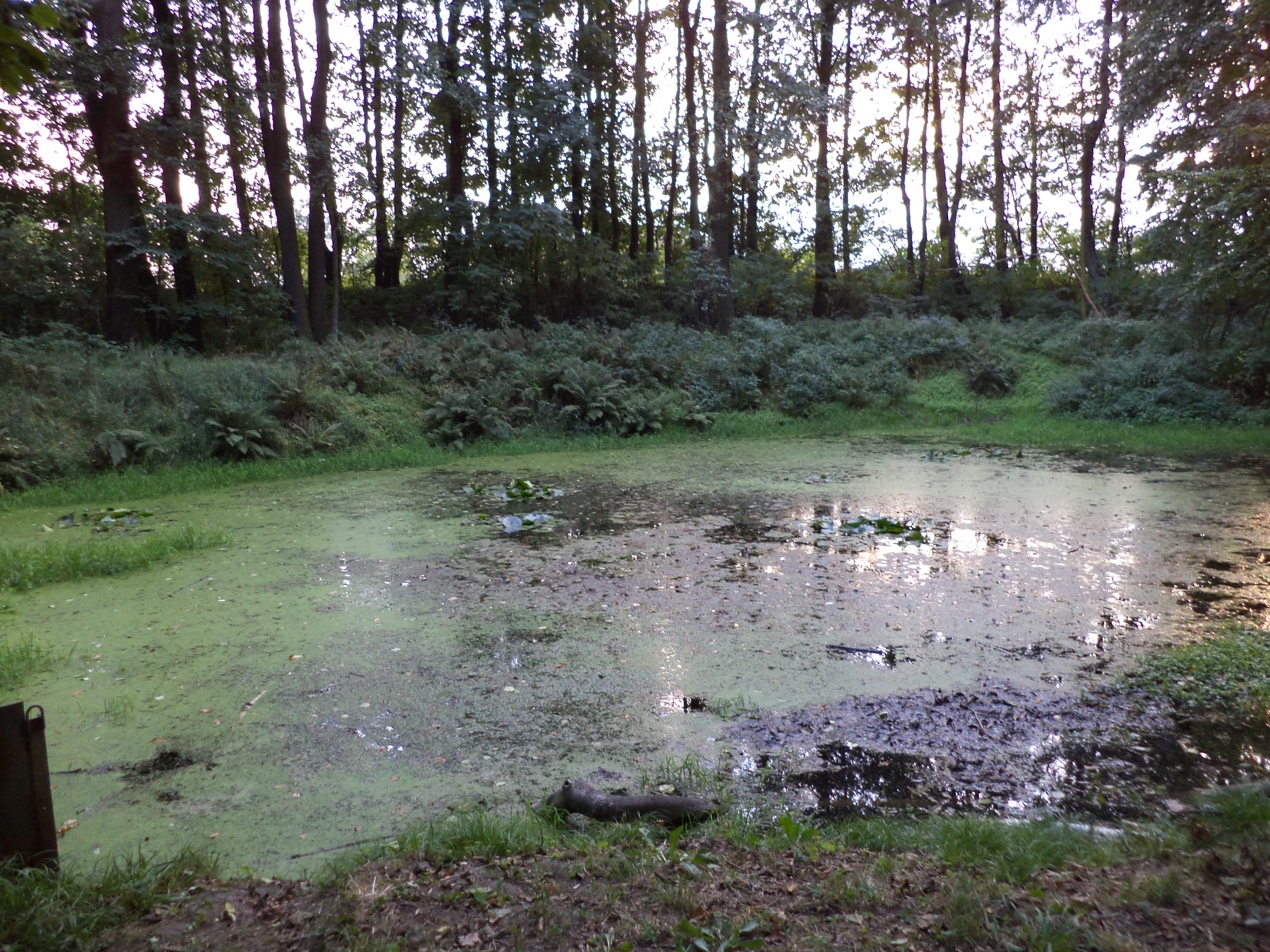
One of the ponds in the park's southern section (2015)

Along Mikołuszka's course, small patches of wetland communities thrive. The montane ash-alder forest (Carici remotae-Fraxinetum) in the mid-section features common alder and European ash with scattered beeches and sycamore maples. Shrubs include tree saplings, rowan, and guelder-rose. The lush ground layer hosts remote sedge, Circaea intermedia, marsh-marigold, yellow pimpernel, creeping buttercup, and the partially protected Veratrum lobelianum. The upper Mikołuszka, left Drama bank, and a northeastern wet hollow support ash-alder riparian forest (Fraxino-Alnetum), dominated by black alder with ash and sycamore. Shrubs include spindle, alder buckthorn, rowan, and red elderberry, with a rich ground layer featuring hairy chervil, marsh hawk's-beard, meadowsweet, yellow loosestrife, and the rare twistedstalk.

The Drama's floodplain supports a meadow foxtail community, with small areas of reed beds: broadleaf cattail (Typhetum latifoliae), common reed (Phragmitetum australis), and reed canary grass (Phalaridetum arundinaceae).

The park retains natural multi-layered, multi-species tree stands with a slightly impoverished forest floor, likely due to late 19th-century alterations. Over two-thirds of its stands exceed 100 years, making it Upper Silesia's largest and one of Poland's most notable clusters of monumental trees, with around 110 qualifying as natural monuments. As of 2019, only seven have this status: four European beeches, one pedunculate oak, one small-leaved lime, and one eastern white pine.

=== Flora ===
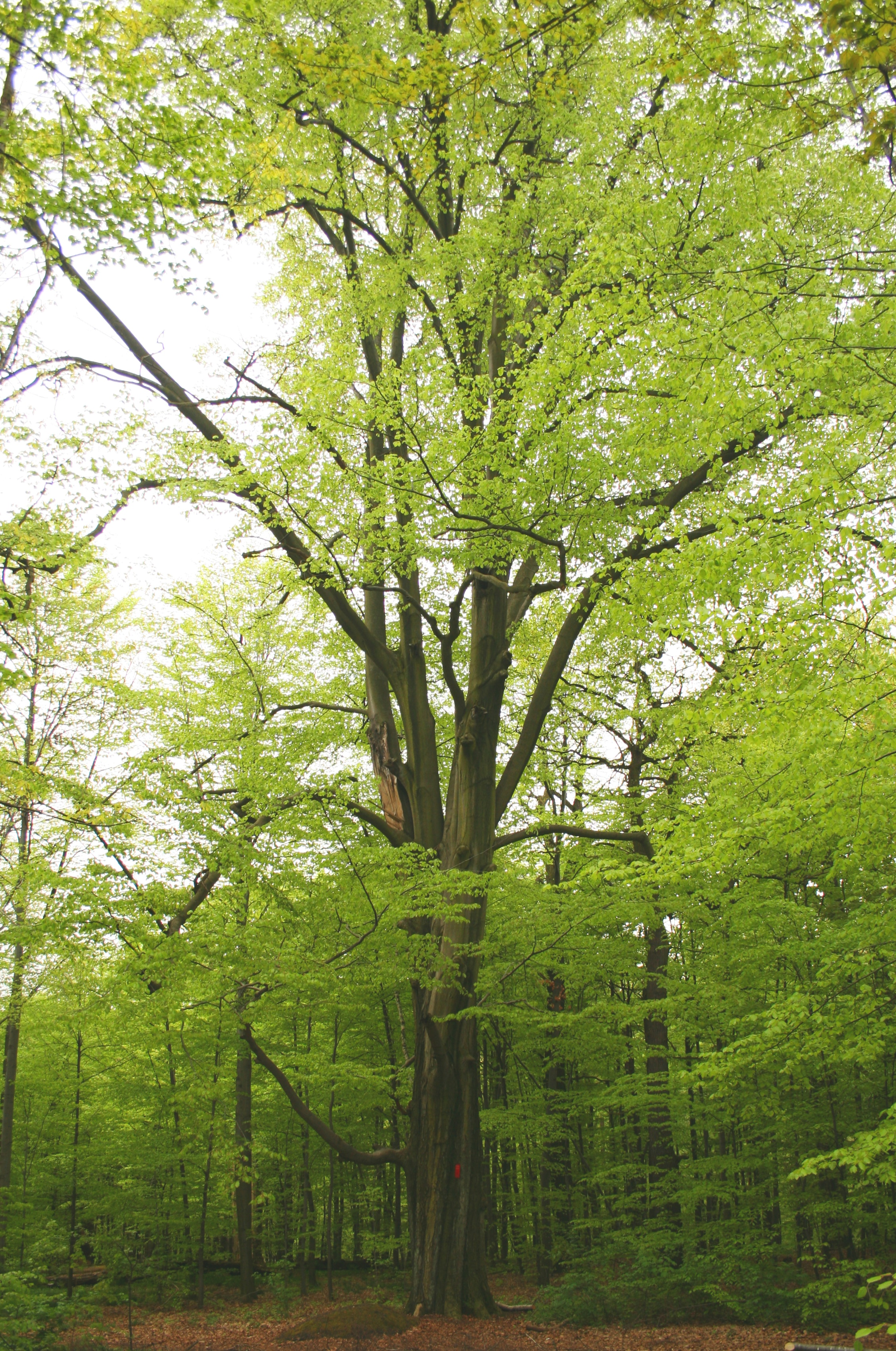
Natural monument – one of the park's beeches (2008)

The 2012 valuation identified 25 protected plant species under then-strict or partial protection lists. Strictly protected species included ostrich fern, red helleborine, narrow-leaved helleborine, heath spotted-orchid, broad-leaved marsh orchid, mezereum, Veratrum lobelianum, stemless carline thistle, garden star-of-Bethlehem, and lesser butterfly-orchid. Partially protected species included alder buckthorn, sweet woodruff, cowslip, oxlip, blackcurrant, lesser periwinkle, and guelder-rose. Yew and yellow azalea occur at artificial sites. Previously noted species like twisted stalk, dwarf everlast, and common polypody, once on the park's wall, were absent in 2012.

=== Fauna ===
Common animals include roe deer, wild boar, red foxes, and beech martens. The 2012 valuation recorded valuable species, some under protection, including beetles like Carabus granulatus, Carabus coriaceus, and violet ground beetle, amphibians like common frog, edible frog, and common toad, reptiles like viviparous lizard, and mammals like European hedgehog, common shrew, red squirrel, and European mole. Bats detected acoustically include common noctule, common pipistrelle, Nathusius's pipistrelle, and species of mouse-eared bats and Plecotus, inhabiting the Tarnowskie Góry-Bytom Underground and Black Trout Adit.

Numerous breeding bird species were noted in 2012, including black woodpecker and collared flycatcher, listed in the EU Birds Directive Annex 1, plus great tit, great spotted woodpecker, common wood pigeon, common blackbird, Eurasian nuthatch, Eurasian blue tit, white wagtail, European robin, Eurasian collared dove, Eurasian jay, Eurasian magpie, Eurasian wren, common starling, song thrush, tree pipit, Eurasian golden oriole, icterine warbler, and Eurasian chaffinch, alongside willow tit, hawfinch, Eurasian sparrowhawk, common raven, fieldfare, marsh warbler, Eurasian coot, European pied flycatcher, short-toed treecreeper, willow warbler, common chiffchaff, dunnock, and stock dove. In 1996, the declining red-breasted flycatcher was also recorded.

== Bibliography ==
- Czylok, Andrzej, ed. (2012). Aktualizacja waloryzacji przyrodniczej miasta Tarnowskie Góry [Updated Natural Valuation of the City of Tarnowskie Góry] (PDF) (in Polish). Czeladź: Aerdo Group. Archived (PDF) from the original on 2 September 2014.
- Hadaś, Tadeusz B. (2000). "Przyroda i jej przemiany w dziejach Tarnowskich Gór" [Nature and Its Transformations in the History of Tarnowskie Góry]. In Drabina, Jan (ed.). Historia Tarnowskich Gór [History of Tarnowskie Góry] (in Polish). Tarnowskie Góry: Museum in Tarnowskie Góry. ISBN 83-911508-3-6.
