= Repecka Street =

Street in Tarnowskie Góry, Poland

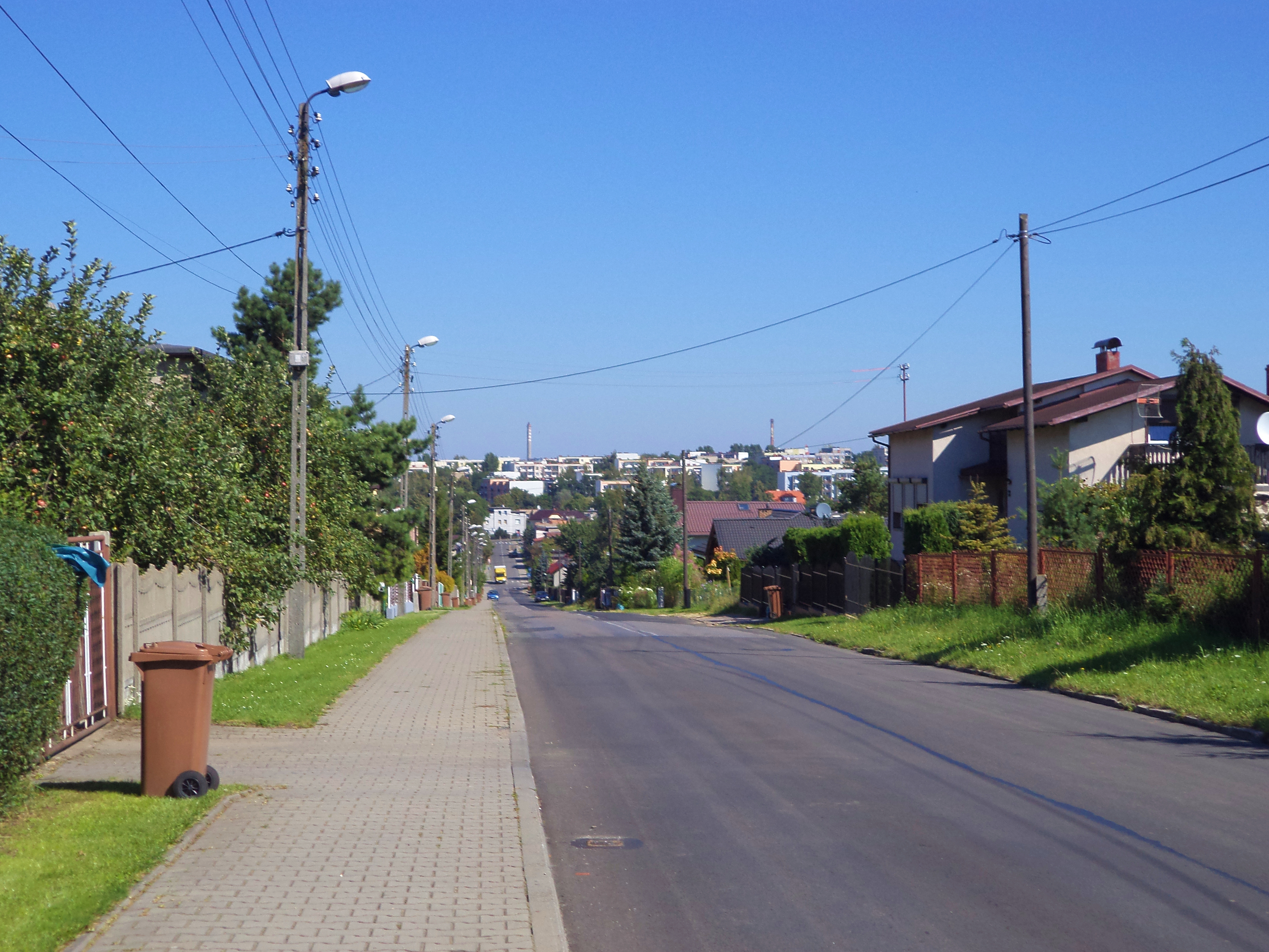
- Repecka Street in Tarnowskie Góry (view northwards)

- Location within Poland
- Part of: Stare Tarnowice, Repty Śląskie
- Length: 2,327 m (7,635 ft)
- Location: Tarnowskie Góry
- Coordinates: 50°25′54.8″N 18°49′11.5″E

Repecka Street is a major street in Tarnowskie Góry, Poland, connecting the districts of Repty Śląskie and Stare Tarnowice. It is a county road (class Z, number 3306S) in Tarnowskie Góry County.

== Route ==
Repecka Street begins at a T-junction with another county road, Stefan Wyszyński Street. After approximately 200 meters, it intersects with Mieczysław Niedziałkowski Street and continues south, ascending a hill where Repty Śląskie district is located. At the hill's summit, it passes the Cegielnia Pond and runs along the edge of the Repty Park (a former game park), listed in the Register of Monuments on 30 December 1966 (No. A/660/66). It also passes the parking area for the Black Trout Adit, where a hunting lodge (German: Jagdschloss) built around 1840 by Carl Lazarus Henckel von Donnersmarck once stood. The street ends at a T-junction with another county road, Wincenty Witos Street.

== History ==
The road linking two of the oldest villages in the Tarnowskie Góry County – Repty Śląskie and Stare Tarnowice – likely existed since their founding. The earliest historical reference to Repty dates to 12 August 1201 (a bull by Pope Innocent III), while Tarnowice is first mentioned on 25 April 1251 (disputed by historians) or 13 April 1338.

The modern Repecka Street appears on late 19th-century maps, including a Prussian Meßtischblatt from 1882 and an 1884 map of ore deposits in the Tarnowskie Góry region.

== Buildings ==
Repecka Street is primarily lined with private residential buildings, some of which are listed in the Tarnowskie Góry Municipal Register of Monuments:

- Residential buildings from around 1900: 17 and 19 Repecka Street
- Residential buildings from around 1920: 2 and 47 Repecka Street
- Residential building from the early 20th century, expanded in 1938: 63 Repecka Street

Additionally, a mid-19th-century stone cross on a pedestal stands near 63 Repecka Street, and a chapel from the second half of the 19th century, containing a statue of Saint John of Nepomuk, is located at the intersection with Mieczysław Niedziałkowski Street.

== Demographics ==
According to the Civil Registry Office, as of 31 December 2022, 235 people were permanently registered as residents of Repecka Street.
