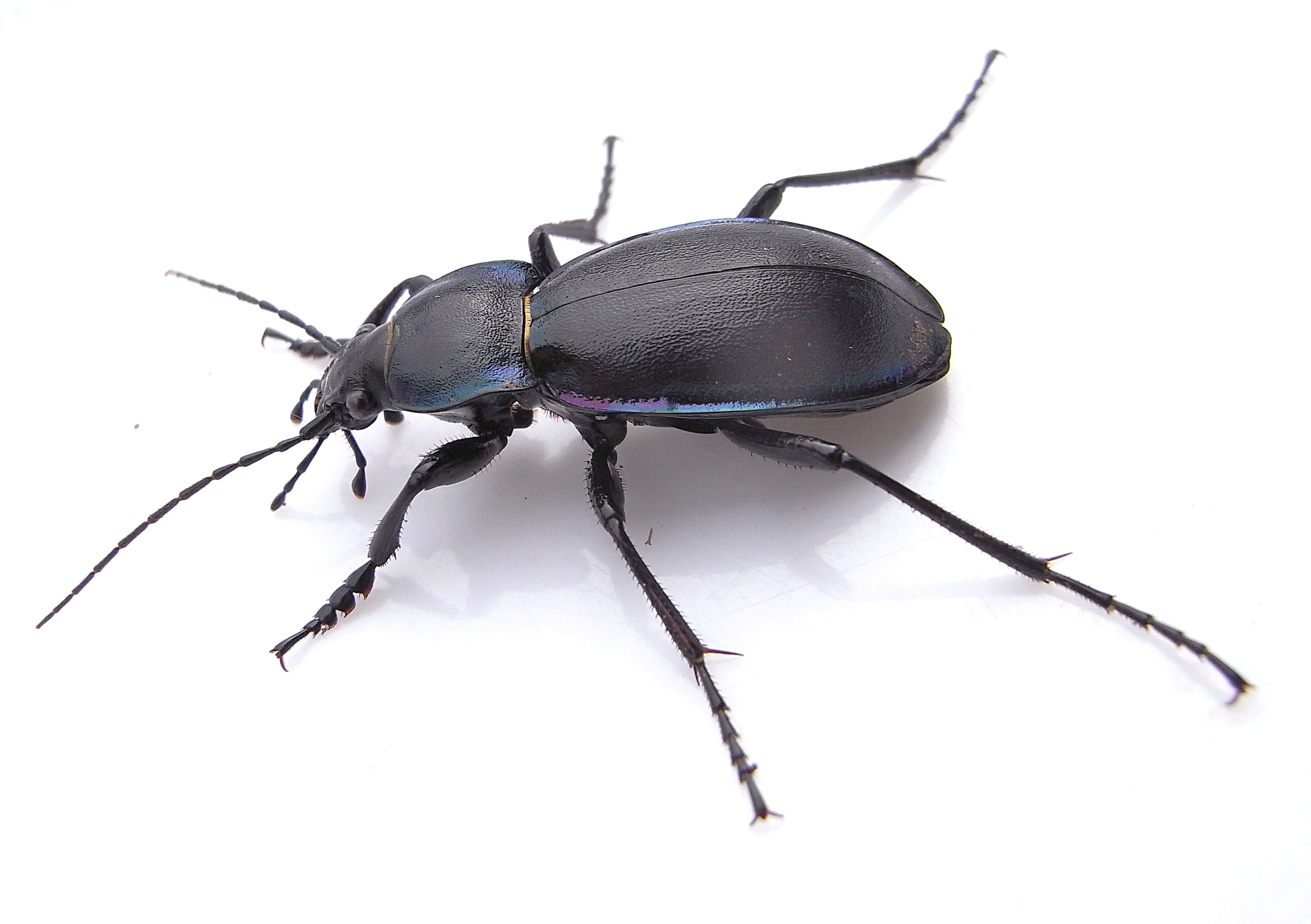

Scientific classification
- Kingdom: Animalia
- Phylum: Arthropoda
- Clade: Pancrustacea
- Class: Insecta
- Order: Coleoptera
- Suborder: Adephaga
- Family: Carabidae
- Genus: Carabus
- Species: C. violaceus

Binomial name
- Carabus violaceus Linnaeus, 1758
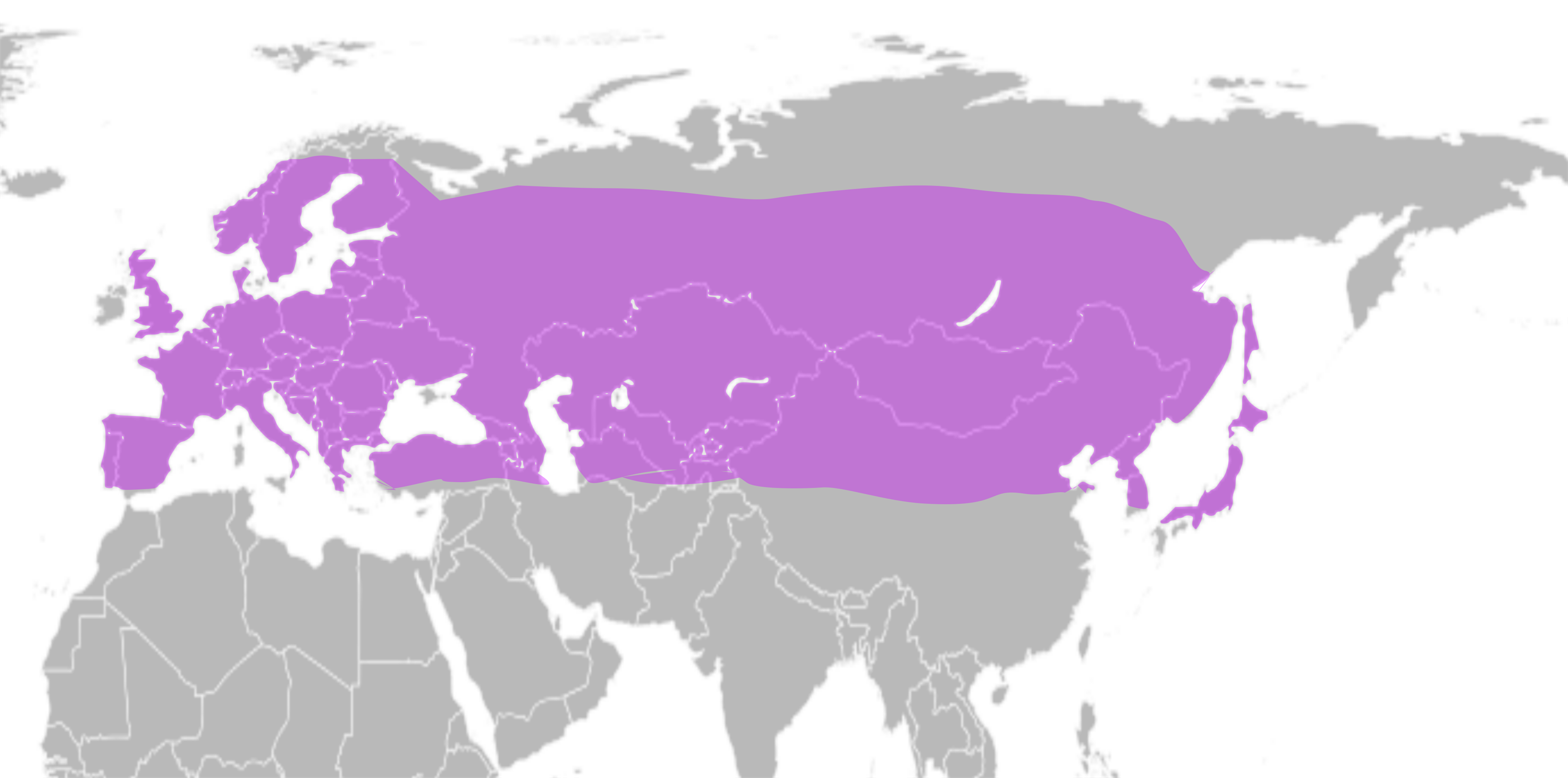

= Carabus violaceus =

Species of beetle

Carabus violaceus, sometimes called the violet ground beetle, or the rain beetle is a nocturnal species of a beetle, from the family Carabidae.

== Classification ==
Carabus violaceus was named by Carl Linnaeus, in the 10th edition of Systema Naturæ. The description of C. violaceus was published in the work's first volume, in 1758. Linnaeus gave its habitat as European forests, and described it as a winged beetle with black wing cases with metallic (Note: The word Linnaeus used was aureo, which means golden, glittery or shiny in the manner of gold, or more figuratively beautiful or good.) margins and a somewhat purple thorax. Carabus violaceus is classified in the Megodontus subgenus, and is considered a "species complex with numerous forms that display slight morphological differences".

Three subspecies of the Carabus violaceus exist. Besides the nominate subspecies C. violaceus violaceus there is also C. v. purpurascens, which has been subject to some systematic controversy: for the past 80 years or so, some taxonomists have ranked it as a species on its own – Carabus purpurascens – while others still considered it a subspecies. However, recent analyses using morphometrics and genetics have "justified" treating the taxon as a subspecies of Carabus violaceus. The two subspecies are known to hybridize. A third subspecies, C. v. picenus is the sister taxon to C. v. violaceus, and is a "conglomeration" of well-known populations. The average genetic divergence between subspecies at the same gene is "comparably high".

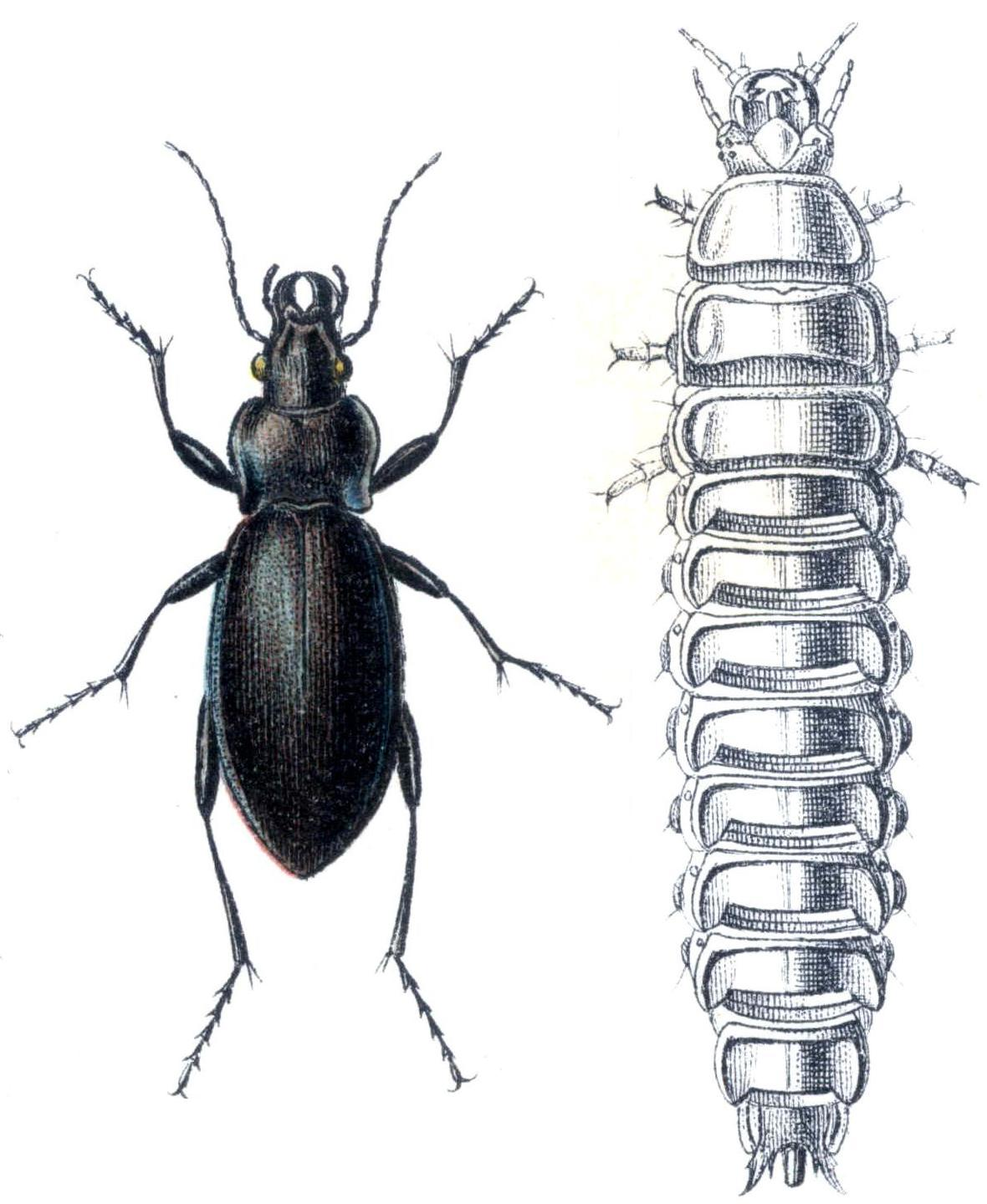
Carabus violaceus adult and larva.

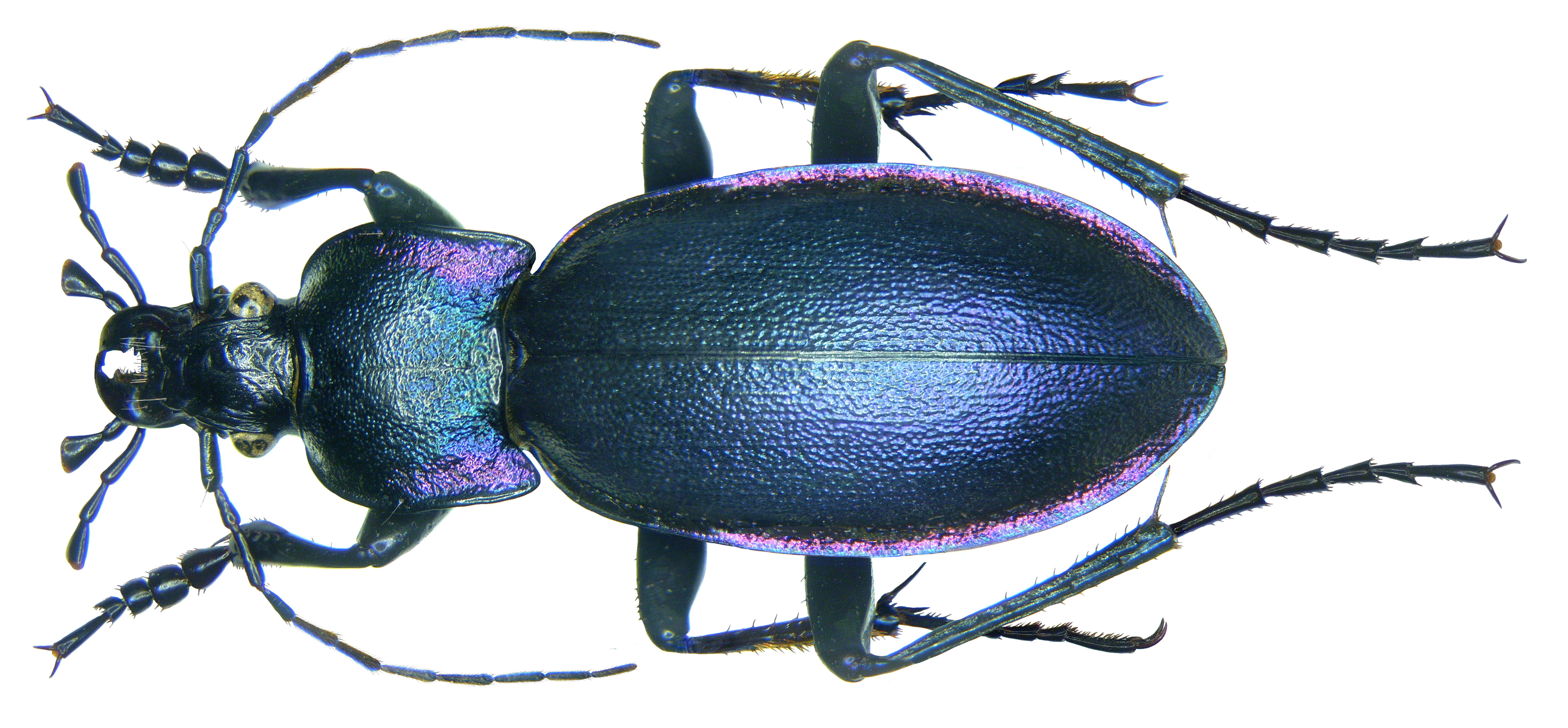
Carabus violaceus picenus

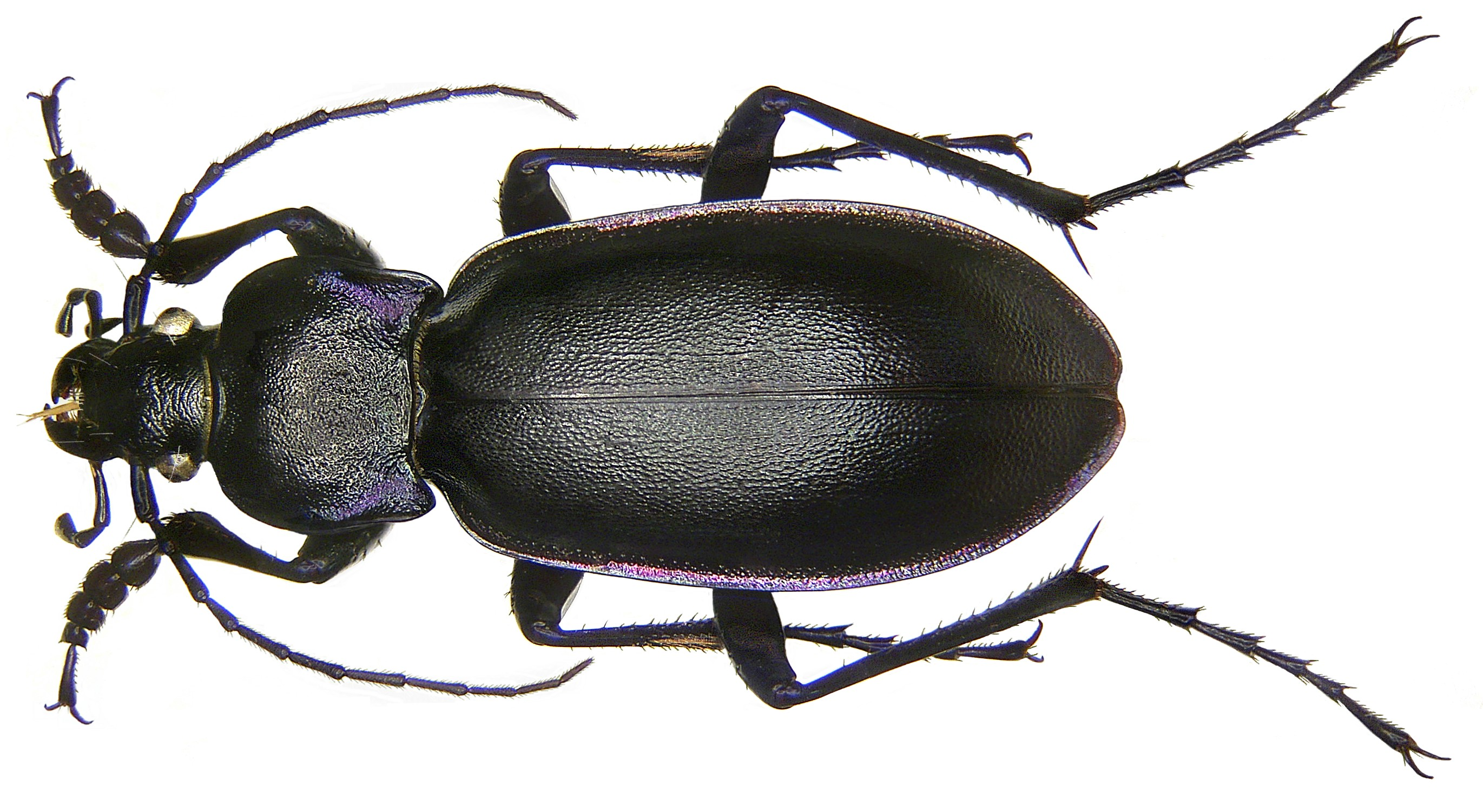
Carabus violaceus violaceus

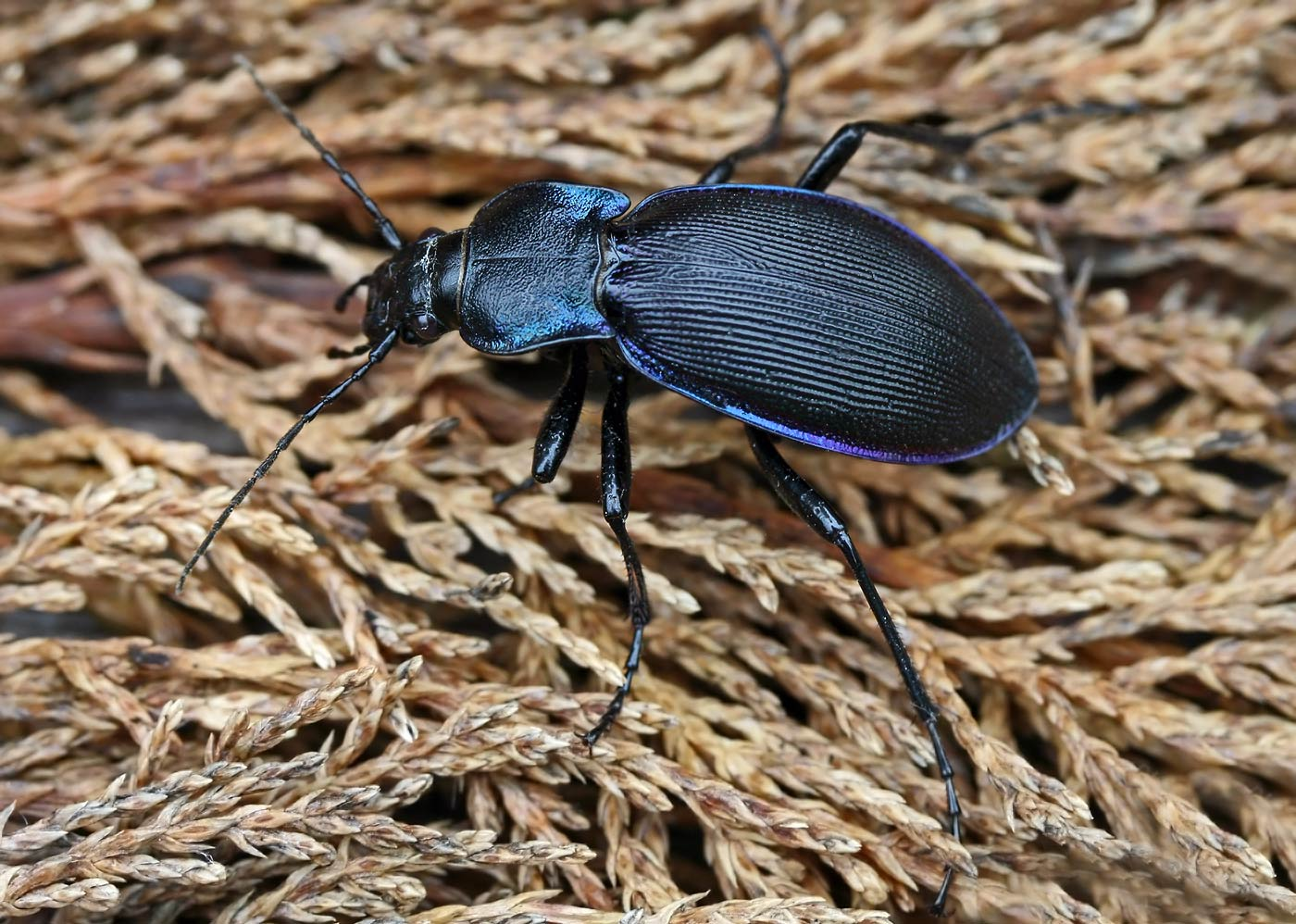
Carabus violaceus purpurascens

== Description ==
Violet ground beetles are flightless beetles, with a black head, thorax and abdomen black with purple lateral margins, and black underside, antennae, and legs. The antennae measure half the length of the body; the thorax is nearly heart-shaped, scalloped at the front and bordered at the back; the elytra are joined, smooth and without ridges or indentations, but do have tiny bumps arranged in "indistinct lines". The body is usually between 2 and 3 centimetres (0.79 and 1.18 in) long. The species appears similar to Carabus problematicus, but the colour on C. violaceus' pronotum is more extensive.

== Distribution ==
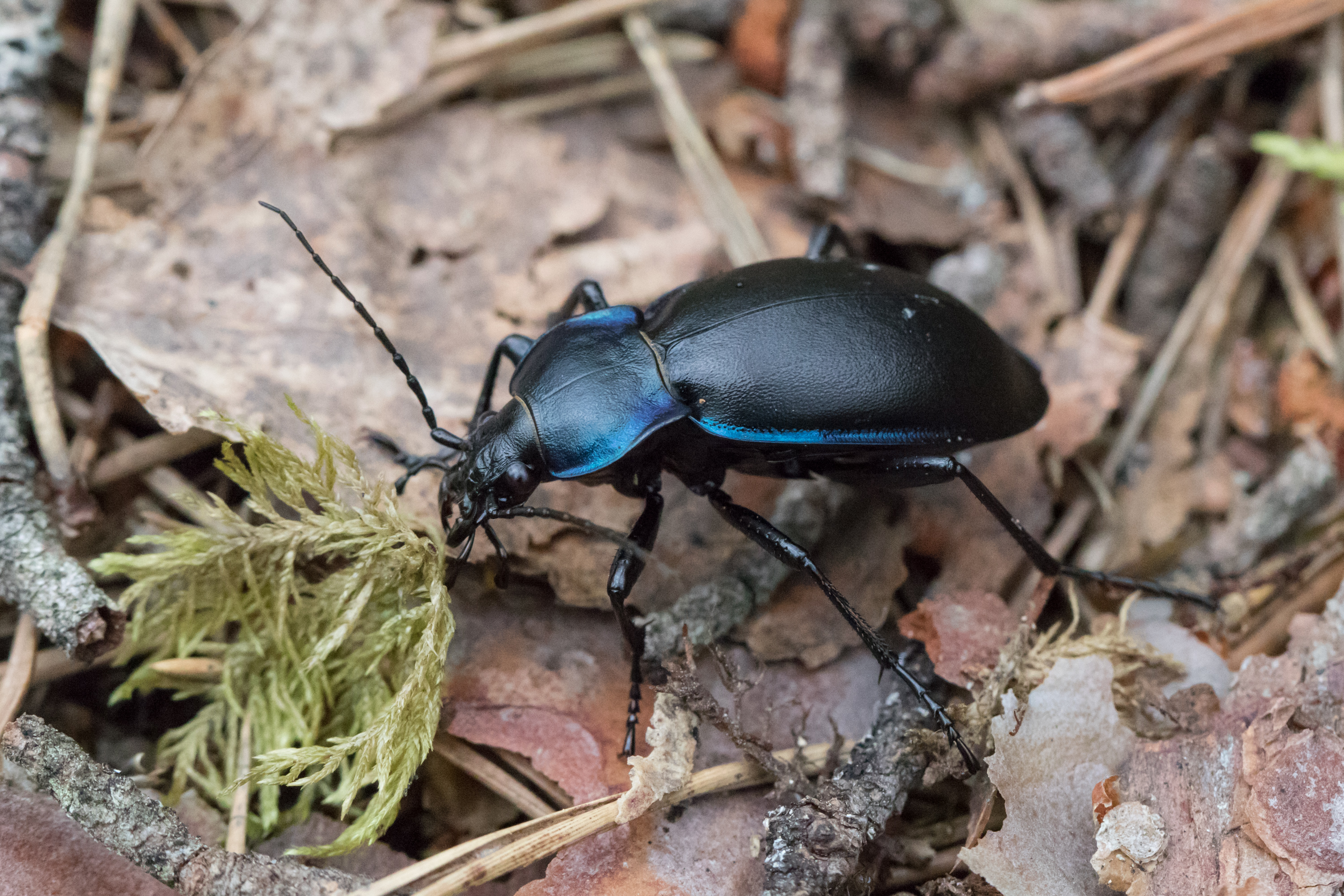
A specimen in south Estonia.

The species is distributed across the Euro-Siberian region. It is common throughout Great Britain.

== Ecology ==
Violet ground beetles live in woodlands both ancient and recent and some adjacent habitats. Because they are flightless and restricted to forested habitats, they are vulnerable to habitat fragmentation and have low dispersal ability: one study showed that only a few kilometres of grassland were enough to render the beetles unable to settle in forests on the other side. However, the subspecies C. violaceus picens is known to inhabit high-altitude pastures. Stomach content examinations have meanwhile shown that jackdaws sometimes feed their nestlings violet ground beetles, among other insects, and that blackbirds also sometimes eat the beetles.

== Bibliography ==
- Assmann, Thorston; Buse, Joern; et al. (2008). "From Latreille to DNA systematics – towards a modern synthesis for carabidology". In Penev, L.; Erwin, T.; Assmann, T. (eds.). Back to the Roots and Back to the Future? Towards a New Synthesis between Taxonomic, Ecological and Biogeographical Approaches in Carabidology. Proceedings of the XIII European Carabidologists Meeting. ISBN 9781435664661. OCLC 247943930.
- Brock, Paul D. (2021). Britain's Insects: A Field Guide to the Insects of Great Britain and Ireland. Princeton University Press. ISBN 9780691179278.
- Coward, T. A. (1910). The vertebrate fauna of Cheshire and Liverpool Bay. Vol. 1. London: Witherby.
- Deuve, Thierry (2023). "Note sur deux Carabus d'Italie et de Géorgie et nouveaux Leistus, Broscosoma et Amerizus de Chine (Coleoptera Caraboidea)" (PDF). Coléoptères. 29 (3). ISSN 1265-3357.
- Linnaeus, Carl (1758). Systema Naturae. Vol. 1. "C. alatus, elytris laeviusculis nigris margine aureo, thorace subviolaceo."
- Matern, Andrea; Drees, Claudia; Hardtle, Werner; Oheimb, Goddert von; Assmann, Thorsten (20 May 2011). "Historical ecology meets conservation and evolutionary genetics: a secondary contact zone between Carabus violaceus (Coleoptera, Carabidae) populations inhabiting ancient and recent woodlands in north-western Germany". ZooKeys (100): 545–563. Bibcode:2011ZooK..100..545M. doi:10.3897/zookeys.100.1546. ISSN 1313-2970.
- Olivier, Guillaume-Antoine (1789). Entomologie ou Histoire naturelle des insectes, avec leurs caractères génériques et spécifiques, leur description, leur synonumie et leur figure enluminee ... Coléoptères Tomes I-V (in French). Vol. 3. Paris: Imp. Baudouin.
- Osawa, S.; Su, Z-H; Imura, Y. (2011). Molecular Phylogeny and Evolution of Carabid Ground Beetles. Springer Japan. ISBN 978-4-431-53965-0.
- Peeters, Ief (1 June 2002). "A field report on Carabus species (Coleoptera: Carabidae) in the Netherlands during October 2021". Phegea. 50 (2). doi:10.6084/m9.figshare.19660737. ISSN 0771-5277.
- Pizzolotto, Roberto; Sapia, Maria; Rotondaro, Francesco; Scalercio, Stefano; Brandmayr, Pietro (2009). "A Georeferenced Biodiversity Databank for Evaluating the Impact of Climate Change in Southern Italy Mountains". In Spehn, Eva M.; Korner, Korner (eds.). Data Mining for Global Trends in Mountain Biodiversity. doi:10.1201/9781420083705. ISBN 9780429150883.
