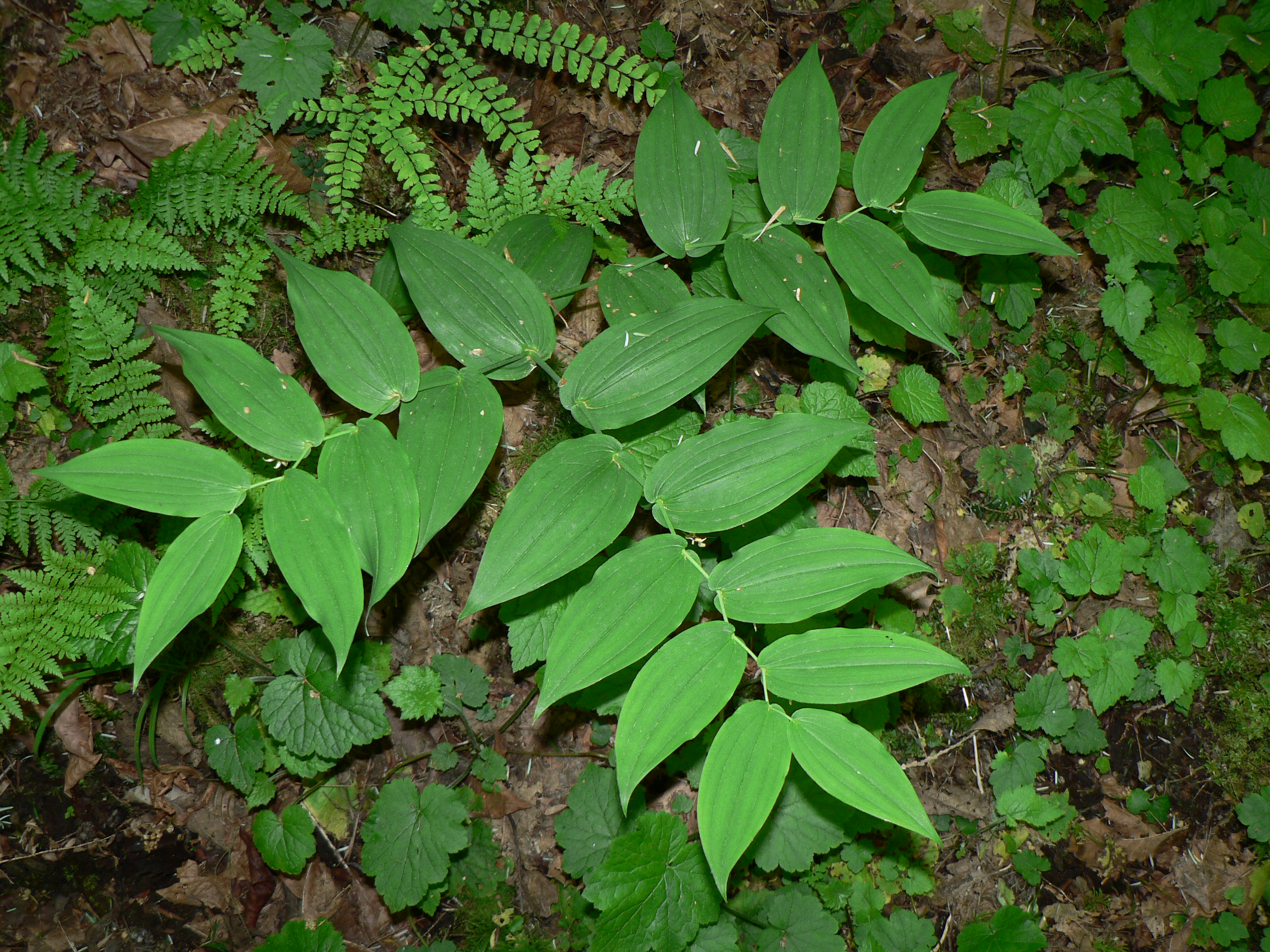
- Squak Mountain State Park

Conservation status
- Secure (NatureServe)

Scientific classification
- Kingdom: Plantae
- Clade: Tracheophytes
- Clade: Angiosperms
- Clade: Monocots
- Order: Liliales
- Family: Liliaceae
- Genus: Streptopus
- Species: S. amplexifolius

Binomial name
- Streptopus amplexifolius (L.) DC.

Synonyms
- List: Convallaria amplexifolia (L.) E.H.L.Krause; Convallaria dichotoma Thibaud ex Pers.; Streptopus distortus Michx.; Streptopus fassetii Á.Löve & D.Löve; Tortipes amplexifolius (L.) Small; Uvularia amplexicaulis Mill.; Uvularia amplexifolia L.; Uvularia distorta (Michx.) Pers.

= Streptopus amplexifolius =

Plant species in the lily family

Streptopus amplexifolius (twistedstalk, clasping twistedstalk, claspleaf twistedstalk, white twisted-stalk, or watermelon berry) is a species of flowering plant in the family Liliaceae, native to North America, Europe and Asia.

It is a herbaceous perennial plant growing to 40–100 cm tall, with alternate, oblong-lanceolate leaves 5–14 cm long. The greenish-white flowers hang from axils on 1–2 cm thin kinked pedicels, each flower with six white tepals, 9–15 mm long. The plants leaves completely encircle the stem, and the stems have a kink at each leaf axil giving the plants stem a "twisted" and wiry appearance. The plants grow in a creeping habit in moist, dense undergrowth.

== Distribution ==
Streptopus amplexifolius is widely distributed across North America (Greenland, northern United States including Alaska; and most of Canada including Yukon and Northwest Territories). The plant is most often found near shaded stream banks and in moist thickets of the montane and subalpine zones across most of North America. It is also found in central and southern Europe (from Spain to Ukraine and as far north as Germany and Poland) and in eastern Asia (Japan, Korea, Myanmar (Burma) and eastern Russia (Yakutia, Amur, Kamchatka, Sakhalin, Kuril Islands, Khabarovsk, Primorye)).

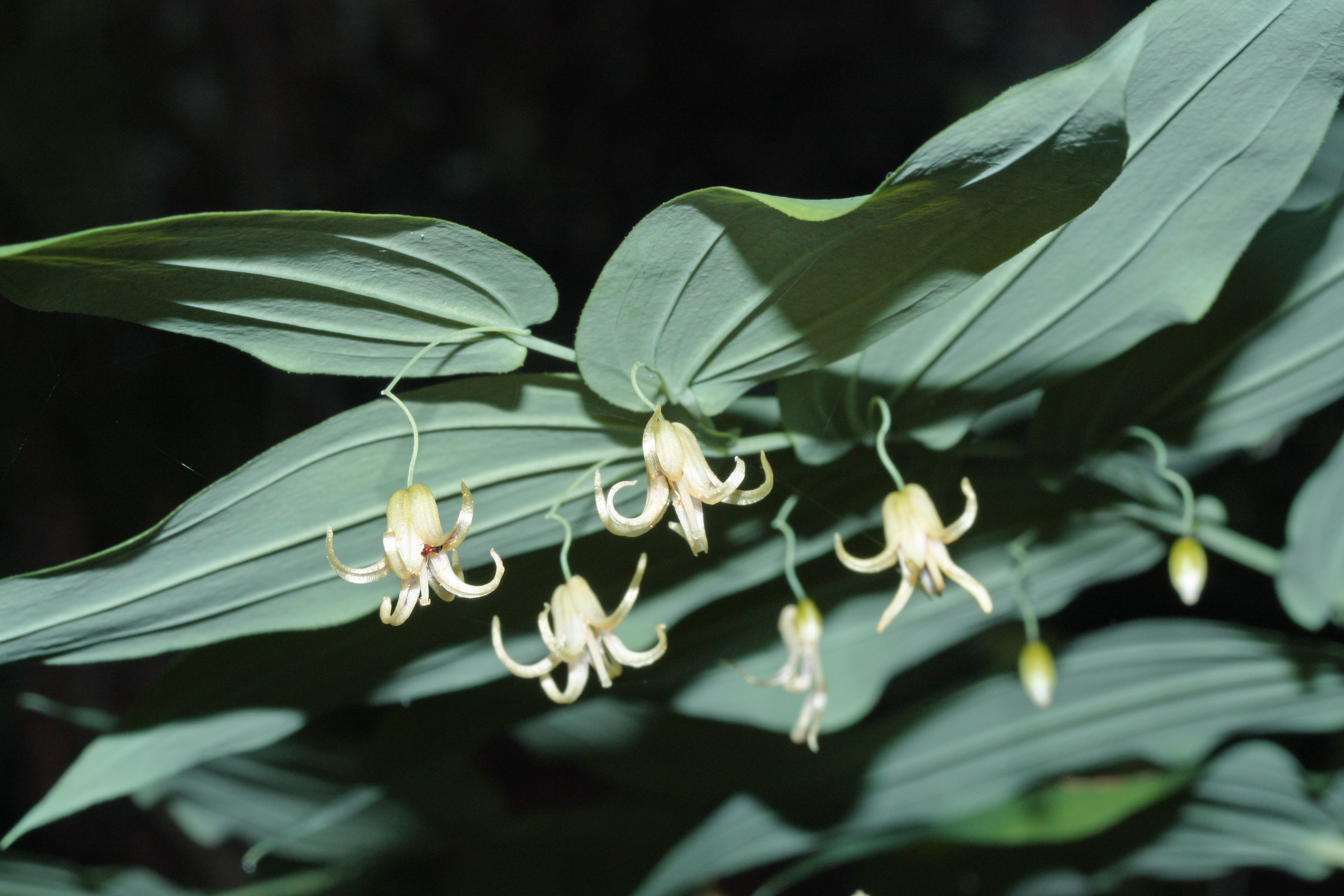
Flowers hang from slender, kinked stalks (Mount Baker-Snoqualmie National Forest).

== Uses and edibility ==
Streptopus amplexifolius was used as a food plant by Native Americans in Eastern North America and as a medicine. The plant was referred to by early settlers of Eastern and Western North America as "wild cucumber" and as "scoot berries" for the mildly laxative effects of the berries if they are eaten in excessive quantities.

The tender young shoots of this plant were eaten by some aboriginal peoples as a salad green, but most considered the plant and berries poisonous. The shoots are sweet with a cucumber-like flavor. The berries are reported to be juicy and sweet, with a watermelon-like flavor. The juice of the berries was used as a soothing treatment for burns by Native American.

Streptopus amplexifolius has a superficial resemblance to False Solomon's Seal (Maianthemum racemosum), but Twisted Stalk produces axillary flowers and fruits along the stem, where False Solomon's Seal produces a terminal inflorescence. Also False Solomon's Seal is always a single unbranched stem, while Twisted Stalk can be branched at the bottom. In fruit, Twisted Stalk is easily identified by its large, juicy red berries which grow from each leaf axil and are highly visible, even in the thickest undergrowth, as they boldly contrast with the surrounding foliage.

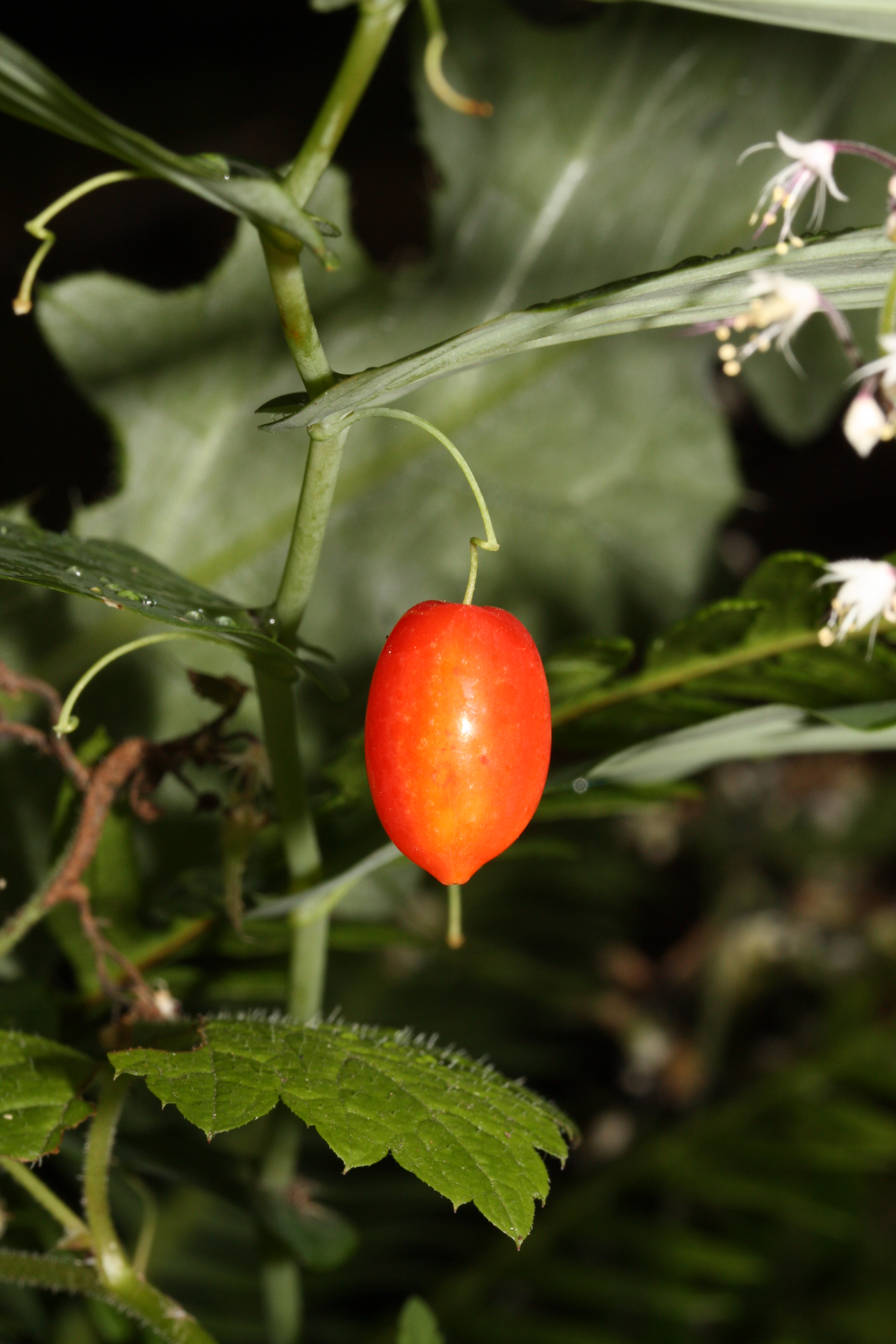
Large, juicy red berries grow from each leaf axil (Mount Rainier National Park).

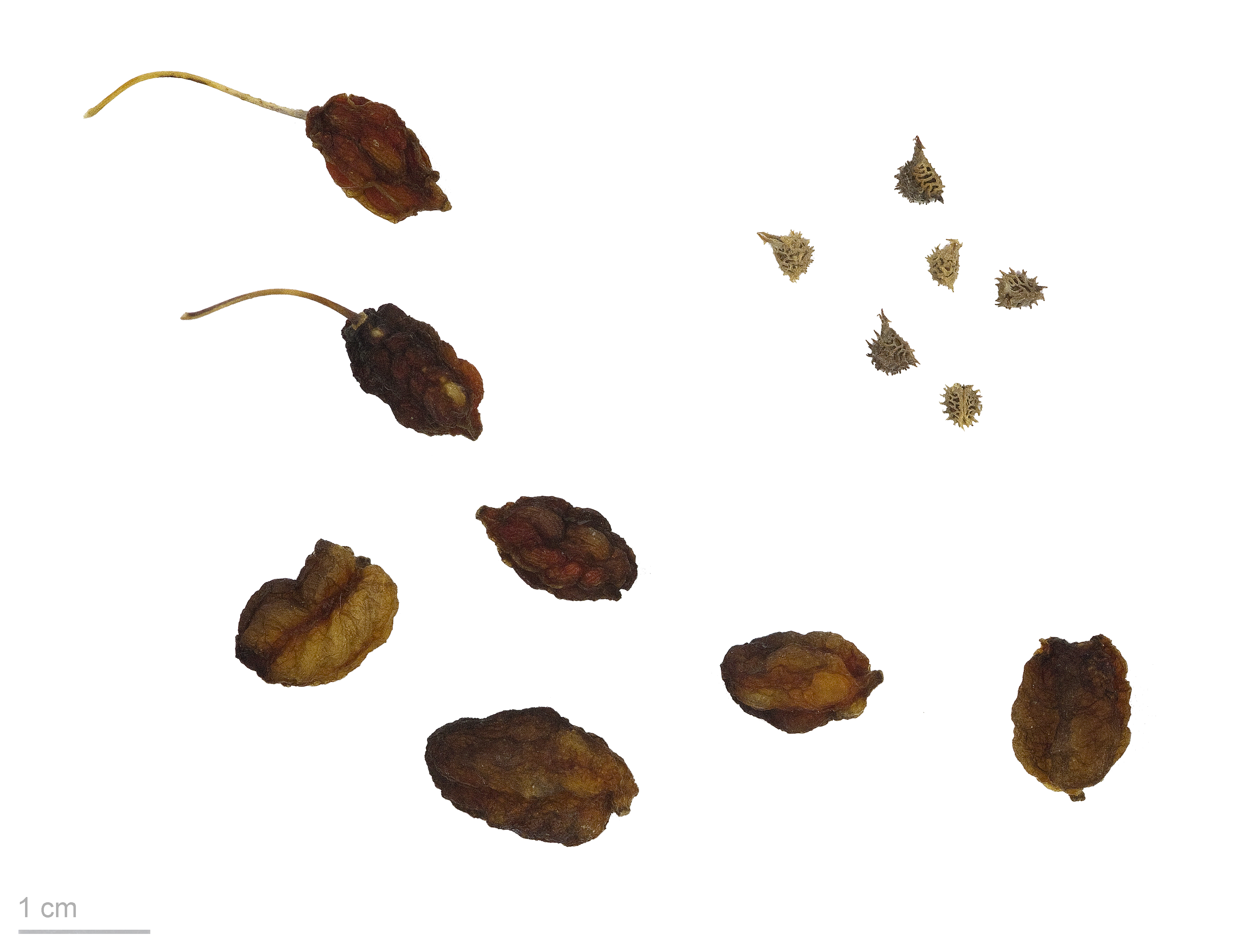
Streptopus amplexifolius - MHNT

When young, Twisted Stalk resembles members of the genus Veratrum, highly toxic plants that are members of the lily family, also. This plant should not be consumed unless identification is positive.
