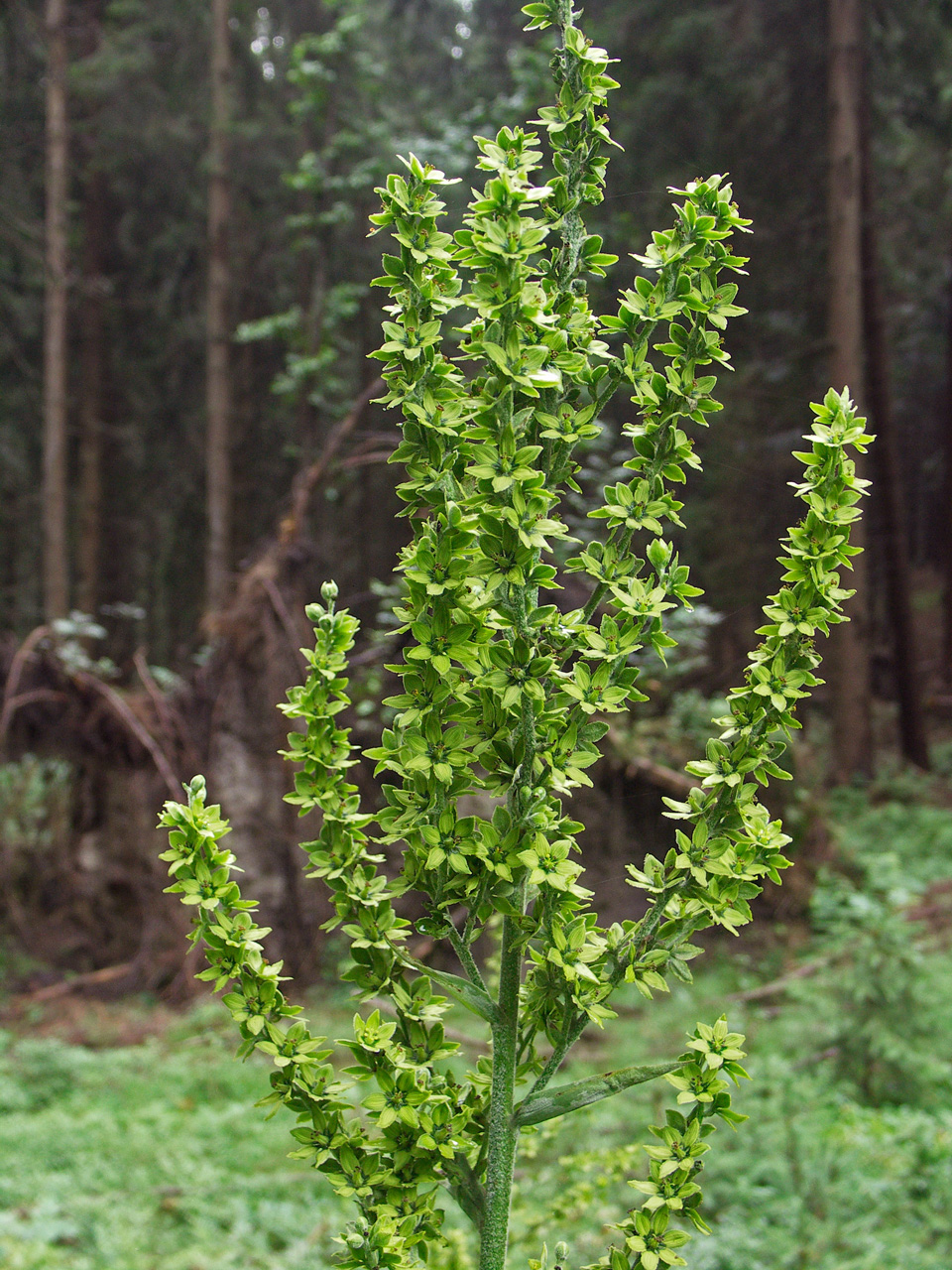

Scientific classification
- Kingdom: Plantae
- Clade: Tracheophytes
- Clade: Angiosperms
- Clade: Monocots
- Order: Liliales
- Family: Melanthiaceae
- Genus: Veratrum
- Species: V. lobelianum

Binomial name
- Veratrum lobelianum Bernh.

= Veratrum lobelianum =

Species of flowering plant

Veratrum lobelianum is a species of flowering plant belonging to the family Melanthiaceae.

Its native range is Central Europe to Caucasus and Russian Far East. The plant is poisonous. It is used in Chinese folk medicine. In Russia, it is available as a tincture ("Veratrum Aqua") that is intended for external use and is toxic if ingested (accidentally or in folk medicine).
