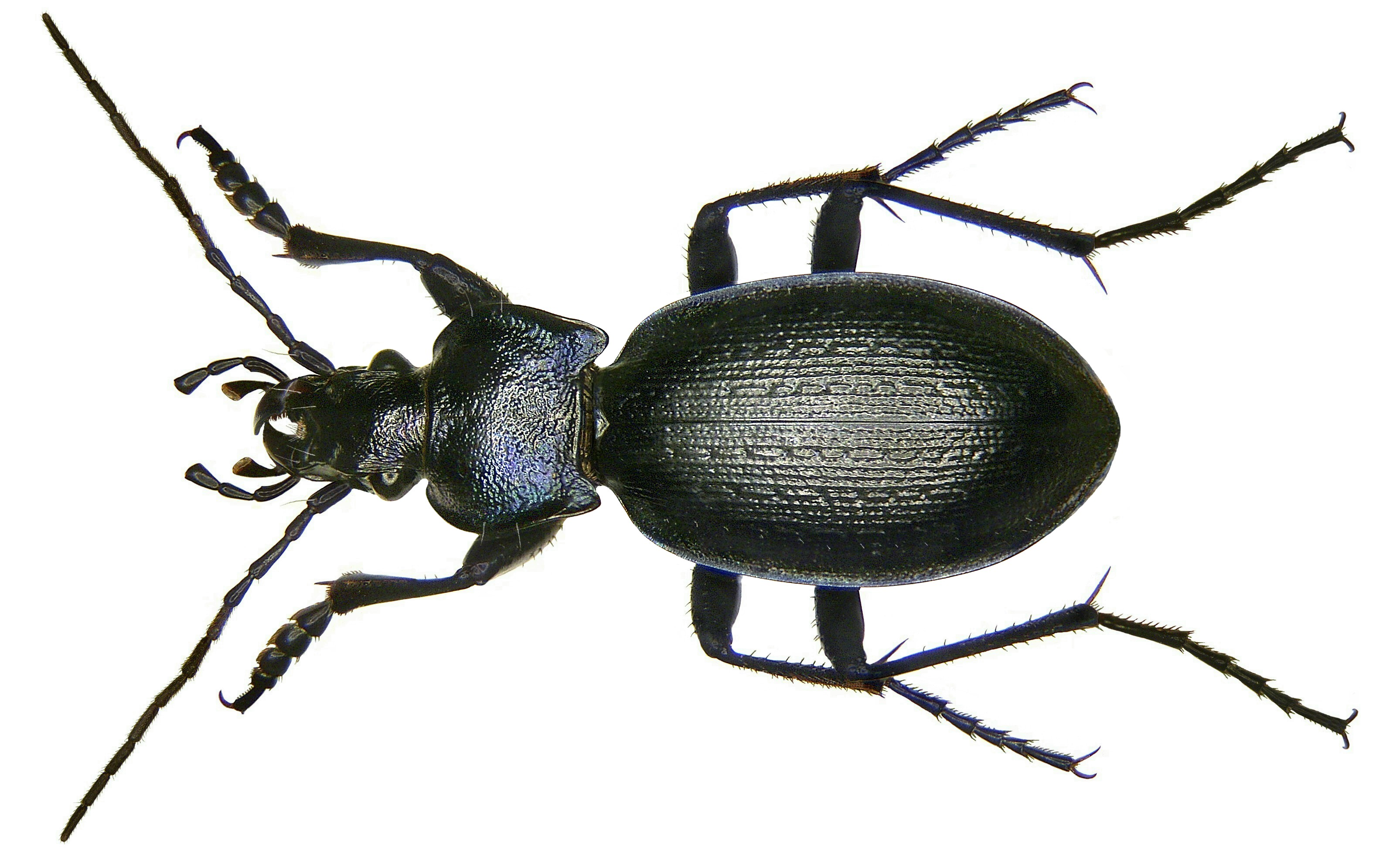

Scientific classification
- Kingdom: Animalia
- Phylum: Arthropoda
- Class: Insecta
- Order: Coleoptera
- Suborder: Adephaga
- Family: Carabidae
- Genus: Carabus
- Species: C. problematicus

Binomial name
- Carabus problematicus Herbst, 1786

= Carabus problematicus =

Species of beetle

Carabus problematicus is a species of beetle endemic to Europe, where it is observed in Andorra, Austria, Belgium, Great Britain, the Czech Republic, mainland Denmark, the Faroe Islands, Finland, mainland France, Germany, Hungary, Iceland, Ireland, mainland Italy, Latvia (doubtful), Liechtenstein, Luxembourg, mainland Norway, Poland, Romania, northern and northwestern Russia, Slovakia, Slovenia, mainland Spain, Sweden, Switzerland, and the Netherlands.

A study of the effects of grazing management on arthropod distribution observed high number clusters of C. problematicus associated with the sheep rather than sheep and cattle grazed plots – suggesting that there are detrimental effects of cattle to the species; possibly as a result of soil compaction.
