= Carl Lazarus Henckel von Donnersmarck =

German businessman

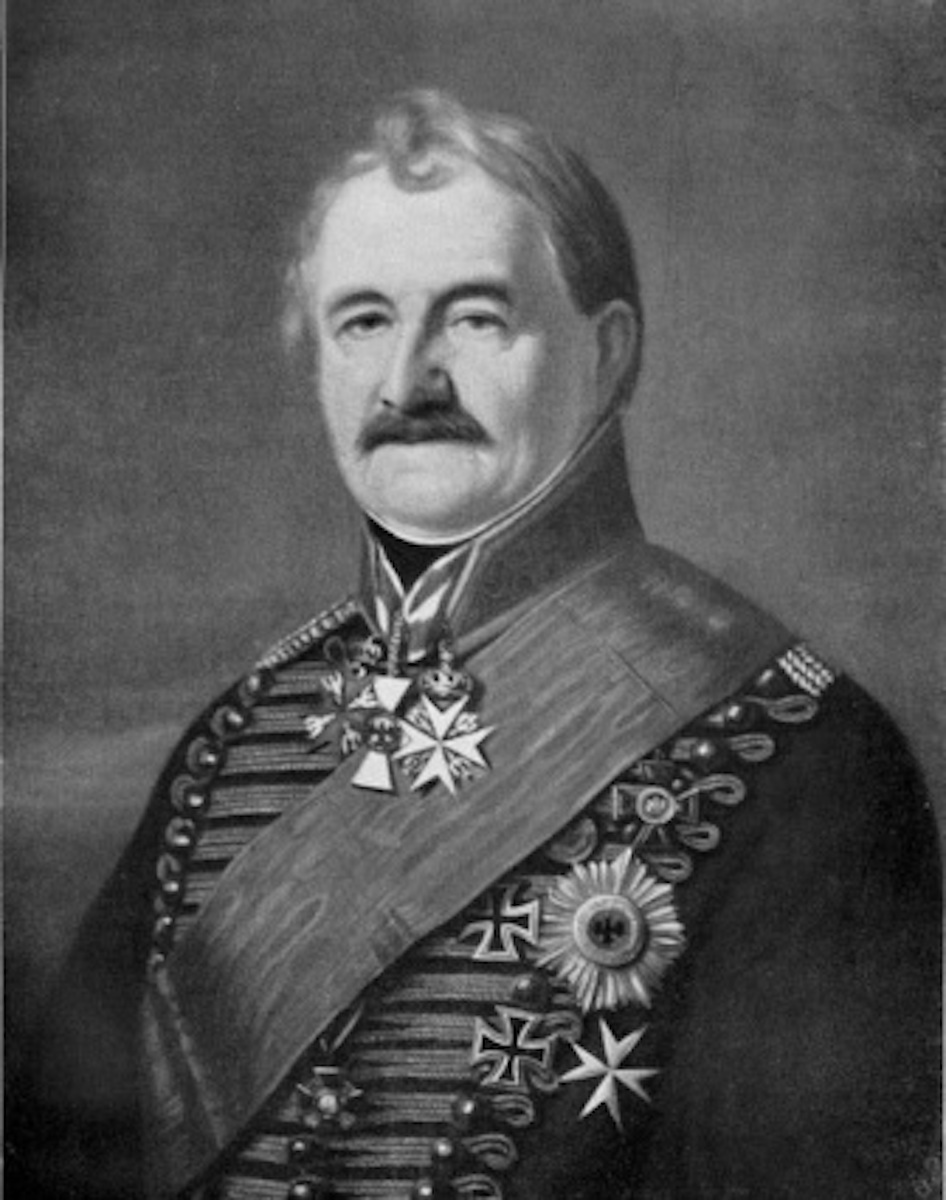
- Honours: Order of Pour le Mérite; Order of the Black Eagle

Count Carl Lazarus Henckel von Donnersmarck (March 5, 1772 – July 12, 1864) was a German businessman who, among other things, founded the mines founding amongst others the mines of Katowice, which now house the Silesian Museum.

== Life ==
Karl Henckel von Donnersmarck was a member of the Henckel von Donnersmarck Austro-German noble family. Donnersmarck was the youngest son of Count Erdmann Gustav von Donnersmarck (1760-1805) and his wife, Baroness Rudolphine von Dyherrn und Schönau (1743-1802).

Karl was married to Countess Julia von Bohlen (1800-1866). Among his children was Count Guido Henckel von Donnersmarck (1830-1916), who would later become a Prince in Prussia and an industrial magnate.

=== Early career ===
During the Napoleonic Wars, Henckel founded and led a regiment of Silesian hussars.

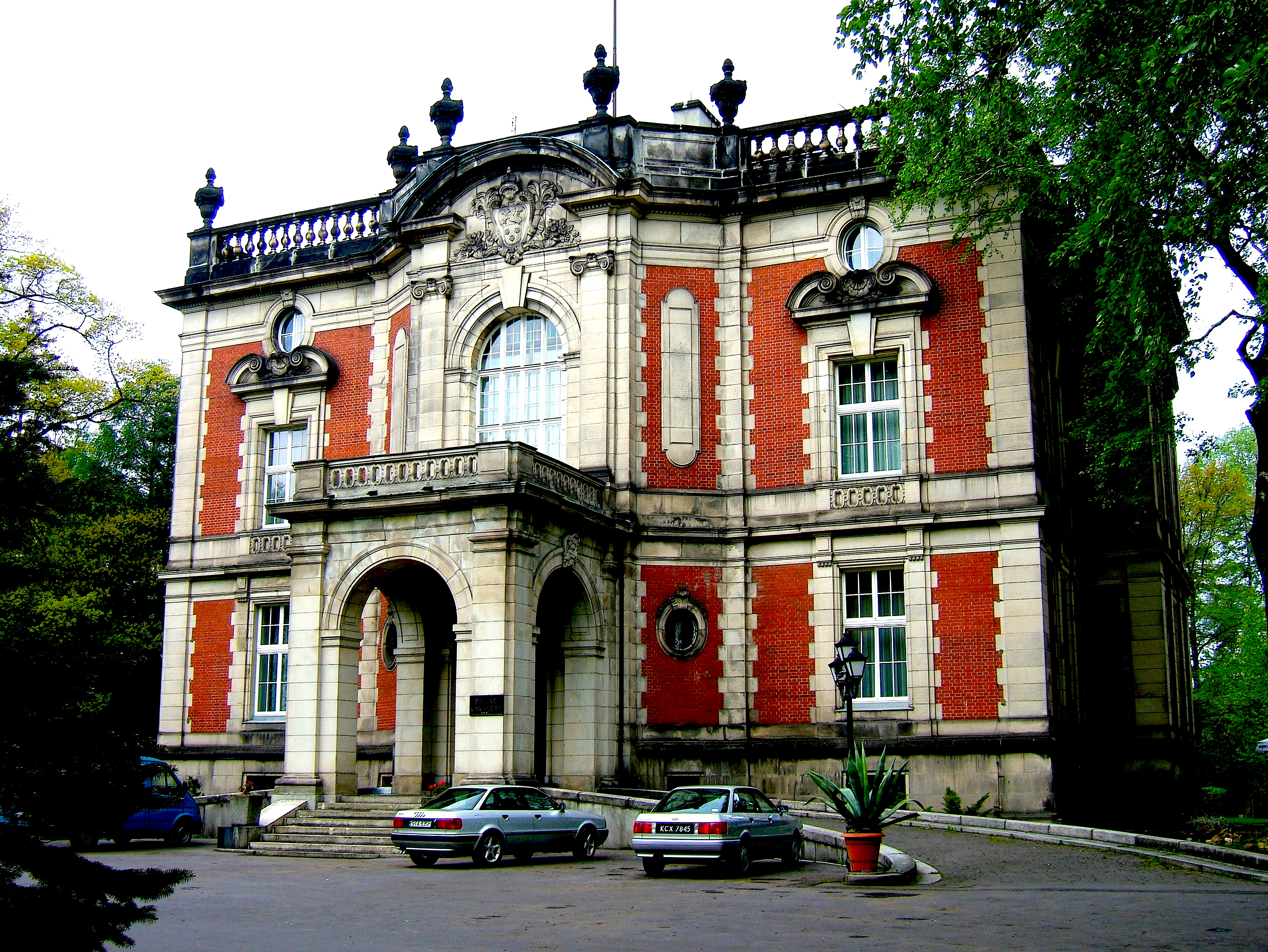
Henckel Estate Swierklaniec

Following the death of his brother Gustav Adolf in 1813, Henckel inherited the family estate in Świerklaniec.

=== Honors and awards ===
He was awarded the Order of Pour le Mérite and the highest Prussian Order of the Black Eagle with Diamonds.

He was the Commander and Senior of the Order of St. John (Protestant equivalent of the Order of Malta).

In 1840 he became a hereditary national senior grandfather in the Duchy of Silesia with the title of "Excellency". As a free statesman, he was a member of the Prussian House of Lords.
