= Potempa =

Potempa may refer to:

- Potempa (surname)
- Potempa murder of 1932
- Potępa, village in Silesian Voivodeship, southern Poland
