= Krupski (disambiguation) =

Krupski is a Slavic surname.

Krupski may also refer to:

- Krupski Młyn, a village
- Gmina Krupski Młyn, an administrative district

== See also ==
- Aleksandr Krupskiy (born 1960), Russian sportsman
- Illya Krupskyi (born 2004), Ukrainian football player
