= Henryk Kukuła =

Polish serial killer

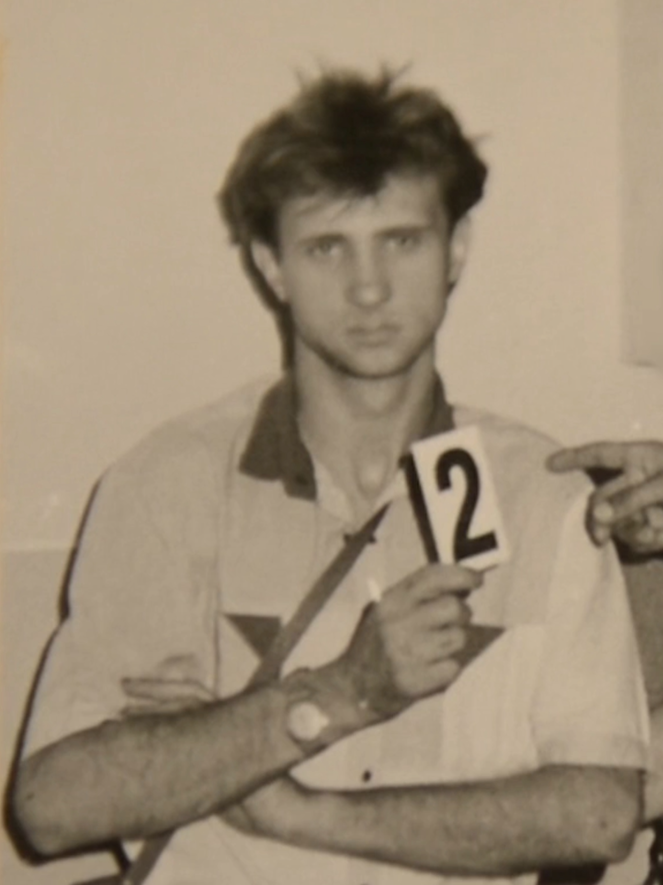
- Kukuła in 1990
- Born: 17 February 1966 (age 60); Chorzów, Poland
- Other name: The Monster from Chorzów
- Conviction: Murder
- Penalty: 28 years in prison

Details
- Victims: 4
- Span of crimes: 1980–1990
- Country: Poland

Henryk Kukuła (born 17 February 1966) is a Polish serial killer, pedophile, and necrophile nicknamed The Monster from Chorzów (Polish: Monstrum z Chorzowa). From September 1980 to July 1990 he raped and murdered four children. He was set to be released from prison in 2020 but in January 2020 the court declared that he stay in isolation.

== Life ==
Henryk Kukuła was born in 1966 in Chorzów. From an early age, he had educational problems and was aggressive with his peers. According to his mother, Kukuła hit his head on a table when he was little. She did not take him to the hospital, and the badly healed injury could have caused the boy's aggression. He was treated in a mental health clinic, but his mother allowed him to discontinue the prescribed medication. A year later, when he was 14 years old, he murdered a five-year-old girl. After killing her, he desecrated the corpse by inserting his fingers into her vagina.

The young murderer was placed in an educational facility in Krupski Młyn. During his stay at the centre, he beat the nine-year-old son of the educator to death, raping the corpse afterwards. He was sentenced to 15 years imprisonment for the crime, and was himself raped in prison by other inmates. Under the amnesty of December 1989, the sentence was reduced to 10 years. In April 1990, Kukuła left the prison and in July of the same year, he raped and murdered two brothers in Ruda Śląska. For this crime, he was sentenced to 25 years imprisonment. He was also given an additional 3 years and 9 months which remained to be served from an earlier sentence. He received an additional year of imprisonment for assaulting a prison guard.

In 2020, after being released from prison, he was sent by court order to the center in Gostynin.

== Victims ==
Nmb.	Victim	Age	Date of death	Place of murder
1.	Karina S.	5	23 September 1980	Chorzów
2.	Radosław T.	9	10 January 1984	Krupski Młyn
3.	Radosław W.	5	28 July 1990	Ruda Śląska
4.	Robert W.	7	28 July 1990	Ruda Śląska

== See also ==
- List of serial killers by country
