= Potempa murder of 1932 =

Murder by Nazi stormtroopers in Germany

The Potempa murder of 1932 was a cause célèbre during Germany's Weimar Republic and the rise of Adolf Hitler and his Nazi Party. Committed by Nazi Party members, the brutal murder cast a dark shadow over the political advance of Hitler and the Nazis at the time. Many acts of violence would follow; the Potempa Murder was an early precursor. It led then President Paul von Hindenburg to suspect that the murder was symptomatic of how the Nazi Party operated.

On the night of 9 August 1932, five uniformed Nazi Stormtroopers (Sturmabteilung) burst into the apartment of Konrad Pietzuch, a Communist miner and trade unionist, in the Upper Silesian village of Potempa (now part of the rural community of Krupski Młyn in Poland) and beat him to death in the presence of his mother. The five murderers did nothing to disguise themselves during the attack and they were quickly arrested. After a well-publicized trial in Beuthen (now Bytom, Poland), they were found guilty of murder and sentenced to death. Hitler, along with other senior Nazis, was furious not only with the verdicts but also with the sentences. While the five murderers were in jail, he sent them a telegram: "My comrades! I am bound to you in unlimited loyalty in the face of this most hideous blood sentence. You have my picture hanging in your cells. How could I forsake you? Anyone who struggles, lives, fights, and, if need be, dies for Germany has the right on his side."

Only days earlier, the government of Chancellor Franz von Papen, which strove for law and order amid rising political violence, had passed an emergency decree authorizing the death sentence for politically motivated killings. Chancellor von Papen was not keen to see the five murderers executed soon after the crime as he feared an escalation of Nazi violence nationwide. In September 1932, the government commuted the sentences to life imprisonment, on the ground that the new decree was unknown to the defendants at the time of the murder. On 6 November 1932, a snap German federal election took place. 33.1 % voted for the NSDAP (SPD 20.4 %; KPD 16.9 %).

The "Potempa Five" became a significant point of contention in the debates between Hitler, von Papen, and President Paul von Hindenburg over the extent of Nazi participation in the German government. On 30 January 1933, continuing political chaos led to Hitler's being appointed Chancellor (they seized power). On 21 March 1933, the Nazi government introduced legislation that granted amnesty to anyone in prison who had committed a crime “for the good of the Reich during the Weimar Republic”. All five murderers were released from prison that same month.

In 1939, Paul Lachmann, who was considered the ringleader of the murder, was arrested and sentenced to prison for poaching. He was killed in an air raid in 1945. Two other convicted perpetrators, Reinhold Kottisch and Rufin Wolnitza, were killed in action at the Eastern Front in the Soviet Union.

== See also ==
- Franz von Papen
