= Ziętek =

Settlement in Silesia

- Village
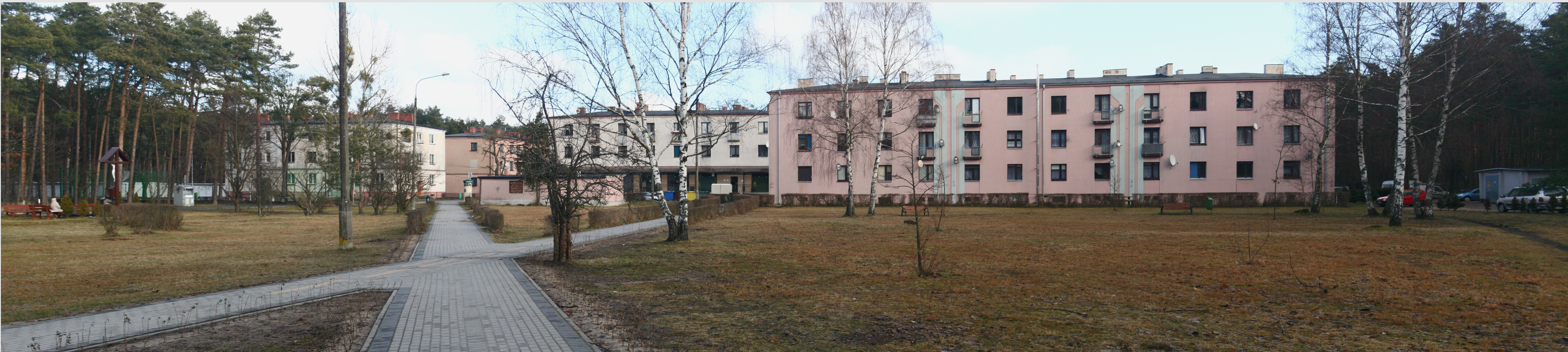

- Location within Poland
- Coordinates: 50°34′22″N 18°38′44″E
- Country: Poland
- Voivodeship: Silesian
- County: Tarnowskie Góry
- Gmina: Krupski Młyn
- Website: http://www.zietek.dl.pl/

Ziętek [ˈʑɛntɛk] is a village in the administrative district of Gmina Krupski Młyn, within Tarnowskie Góry County, Silesian Voivodeship, in southern Poland.
