= Franz von Papen =

Chancellor of Germany in 1932

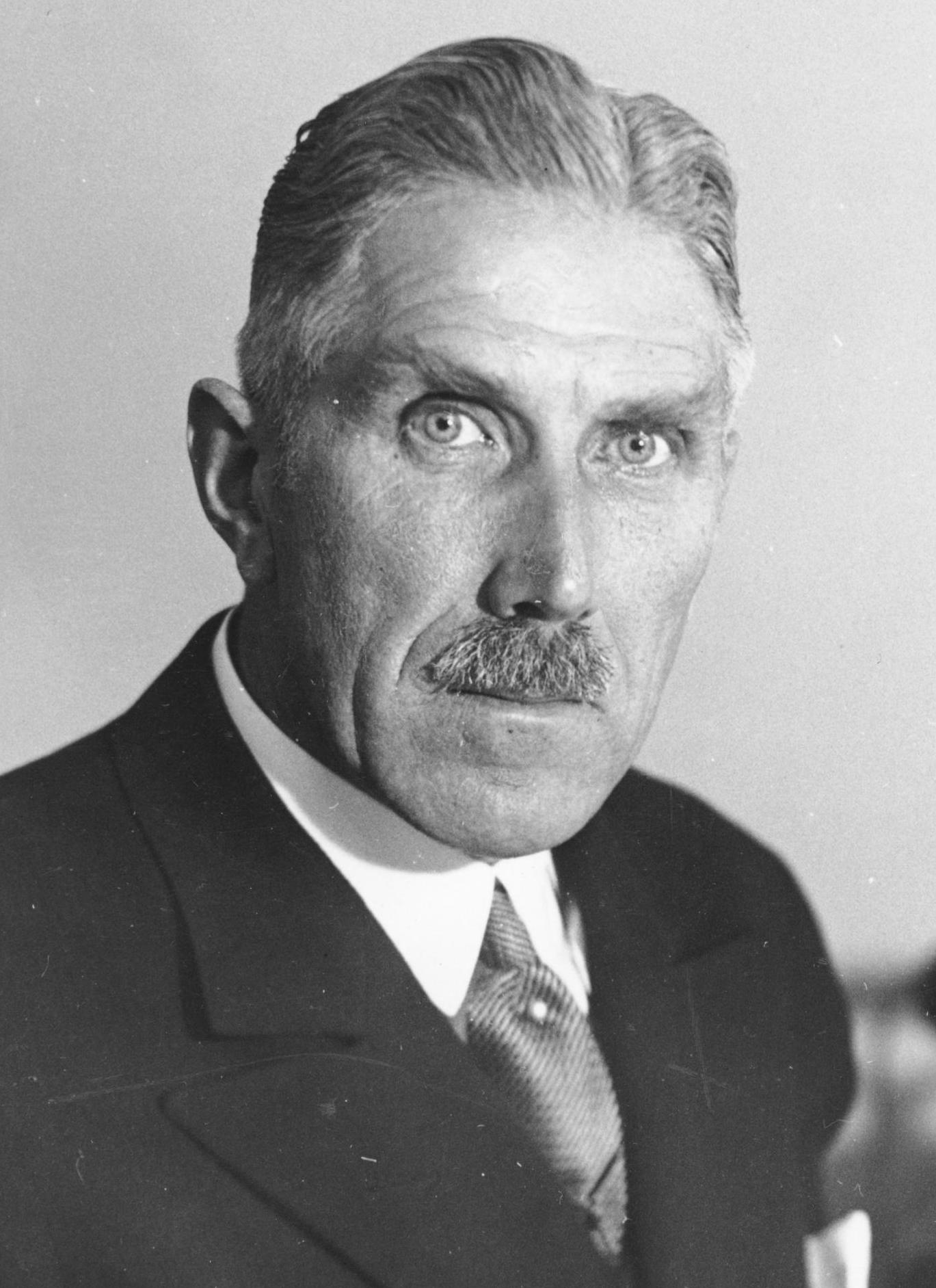
- Papen in 1933

Chancellor of Germany
- In office 1 June 1932 – 3 December 1932
- President: Paul von Hindenburg
- Preceded by: Heinrich Brüning
- Succeeded by: Kurt von Schleicher

Ambassador of Germany to Turkey
- In office 17 April 1939 – 11 August 1944
- Nominated by: Adolf Hitler
- Preceded by: Friedrich von Keller
- Succeeded by: Wilhelm Haas (1952)

Ambassador of Germany to Austria
- In office 20 August 1934 – 11 February 1938
- Nominated by: Adolf Hitler
- Preceded by: Kurt Rieth
- Succeeded by: Carl-Hermann Mueller-Graaf (1952)

Vice-Chancellor of Germany
- In office 30 January 1933 – 7 August 1934
- Chancellor: Adolf Hitler
- Preceded by: Hermann Dietrich
- Succeeded by: Franz Blücher (1949 as Vice-Chancellor of West Germany)

Reichskommissar of Prussia
- In office 30 January 1933 – 10 April 1933
- Preceded by: Kurt von Schleicher
- Succeeded by: Hermann Göring
- In office 20 July 1932 – 3 December 1932
- Preceded by: Office established Otto Braun (as Ministerpräsident)
- Succeeded by: Kurt von Schleicher

Member of the Reichstag
- In office 21 March 1933 – 1 November 1933
- Constituency: DNVP National List
- In office 1 November 1933 – 7 August 1934

Member of the Landtag of Prussia for Westphalia North
- In office 10 March 1921 – 20 May 1928
- In office 1 February 1930 – 20 July 1932
- Preceded by: Theodor Roeingh

Personal details
- Born: Franz Joseph Hermann Michael Maria von Papen; 29 October 1879 Werl, Germany
- Died: 2 May 1969 (aged 89) Sasbach, West Germany
- Resting place: Wallerfangen, Germany
- Party: Centre (1918–1932); Independent (1932–1938); Nazi (NSDAP; 1938–1945)
- Spouse: Martha von Boch-Galhau (m. 1905; died 1961)
- Children: 5
- Education: Preußische Hauptkadettenanstalt
- Profession: Politician/Diplomat, military officer

Military service
- Allegiance: German Empire
- Branch/service: Imperial German Army
- Years of service: 1898–1919
- Rank: Oberstleutnant
- Battles/wars: World War I; Western Front; Battle of the Somme; Battle of Vimy Ridge; Middle Eastern theatre; Sinai and Palestine Campaign
- Awards: Iron Cross, 1st Class; War Merit Cross

Franz Joseph Hermann Michael Maria von Papen, Erbsälzer zu Werl und Neuwerk (German: [ˈfʁants fɔn ˈpaːpn̩]; 29 October 1879 – 2 May 1969) was a German politician, diplomat, army officer, and Prussian nobleman who served as Chancellor of Germany in 1932, and then as Vice-Chancellor under Adolf Hitler from 1933 to 1934. A national conservative and committed monarchist, he is largely remembered for his role in Hitler's rise to power.

Born into an influential aristocratic Westphalian family, Papen served in the Prussian Army from 1898 onward and was trained as an officer of the German General Staff. He served as a military attaché in Mexico and the United States from 1913 to 1915, while also covertly organising acts of sabotage in the United States and quietly backing and financing Mexican forces in the Mexican Revolution on behalf of German military intelligence. After being expelled as persona non grata by the United States State Department in 1915, he served as a battalion commander on the Western Front of World War I and finished his war service in the Middle Eastern theatre as a lieutenant colonel.

Asked to become chancellor of the Weimar Republic by President Paul von Hindenburg in 1932, Papen ruled by presidential decree. He launched the Preußenschlag coup against the Social Democratic Party-led Government in the Free State of Prussia, and dissolved the Reichstag twice under his short tenure. His failure to secure a base of support in the Reichstag led to his removal by Hindenburg and replacement by his former ally, General Kurt von Schleicher.

Determined to return to power, Papen, believing that Adolf Hitler could be reined-in once he was in government, and underestimating Hitler's political skill and ruthlessness, pressured Hindenburg to appoint Hitler as chancellor and himself as vice-chancellor in 1933, in a cabinet ostensibly not under Nazi Party domination. Viewing military dictatorship as the sole alternative to a Nazi Party chancellor, Hindenburg consented. Papen and his allies were quickly marginalized by Hitler and he left the government after the Night of the Long Knives in 1934, during which the Nazis placed him under house arrest, ransacked his office and murdered some of his close associates.

Subsequently, Papen served the German Foreign Office as the ambassador in Vienna from 1934 to 1938 and in Ankara from 1939 to 1944. He joined the Nazi Party in 1938. During his tenure as the Austrian ambassador, he assisted in the handover of Austria to Germany (Anschluss) by convincing Kurt von Schuschnigg, the then-Austrian Chancellor, to sign Austria's sovereignty away to Nazi Germany, on Feb. 12, 1938.

After World War II, Papen was indicted for Nazi war crimes in the Nuremberg trials before the International Military Tribunal but was acquitted of all charges. In 1947, a West German denazification court found Papen to have acted as the main culprit in crimes relating to the Nazi government. Papen was given a sentence of eight years' imprisonment and hard labor, but was released on appeal in 1949. In his memoirs, such as the Der Wahrheit eine Gasse (Giving Truth a Chance), published in 1952, he insistently downplayed his involvement and portrayed himself as a tragic patriot; he died in 1969.

== Early life and education ==
Franz Joseph Hermann Michael Maria von Papen was born on 29 October 1879, in Werl, Westphalia, into a wealthy and noble Catholic family. He was the third child of Friedrich von Papen-Köningen (1839–1906) and his wife Anna Laura von Steffens (1852–1939). His father, a cavalry officer in the Prussian Army, had served in the Second Schleswig War, the Austro-Prussian War, and the Franco-Prussian War, taking part in the battles of Dybbøl, Königgrätz, and Sedan, and in the Siege of Paris. He was also a friend of Kaiser Wilhelm II, whom he had met as a student in Bonn, where both men had been members of the Corps Borussia Bonn; after his military career, he held several posts in local politics, including that of honorary deputy mayor (Bürgermeister) of Werl. Members of the Papen family, which held erbsälzer status, had enjoyed the hereditary right to mine brine salt at Werl since 1298(?), a fact of which Franz was very proud; he always believed in the superiority of the aristocracy over commoners.

Papen was sent to a cadet school in Bensberg of his own volition at the age of 11 in 1891. His four years there were followed by three years of training at the Preußische Hauptkadettenanstalt in Lichterfelde. He was trained as a Herrenreiter ("gentleman rider"). He served for a period as a military attendant in the Kaiser's Palace and as a second lieutenant in his father's old unit, the Westphalian Uhlan Regiment No. 5 in Düsseldorf. Papen joined the German General Staff as a captain in March 1913.

On 3 May 1905, he married Martha von Boch-Galhau (1880–1961), the daughter of René von Boch-Galhau, a wealthy Saarland industrialist and member of the Villeroy & Boch dynasty of ceramics manufacturers; her dowry made him a very rich man. An excellent horseman and a man of much charm, Papen cut a dashing figure and during this time, befriended Kurt von Schleicher. Fluent in both French and English, he travelled widely all over Europe, the Middle East and North America. He was devoted to Kaiser Wilhelm II. Influenced by the books of General Friedrich von Bernhardi, Papen was a militarist throughout his life.

== Military attaché and spymaster in Washington, D.C. ==
Papen entered the diplomatic service in December 1913 as a military attaché to the German ambassador in the United States.

In early 1914, Papen travelled to Mexico (to which he was also accredited) and observed the Mexican Revolution. At one time, when the anti-Huerta Zapatistas were advancing on Mexico City, he organised a group of European volunteers to fight for Mexican General Victoriano Huerta. In the spring of 1914, as German military attaché to Mexico, Papen was deeply involved in selling arms to the government of General Huerta, believing he could place Mexico in the German sphere of influence, though the collapse of Huerta's regime in July 1914 ended that hope.

In April 1914, Papen personally observed the United States occupation of Veracruz, despite orders from Berlin to stay in Mexico City. During his time in Mexico, Papen acquired the love of international intrigue and adventure that characterised his later diplomatic postings in the United States, Austria and Turkey.

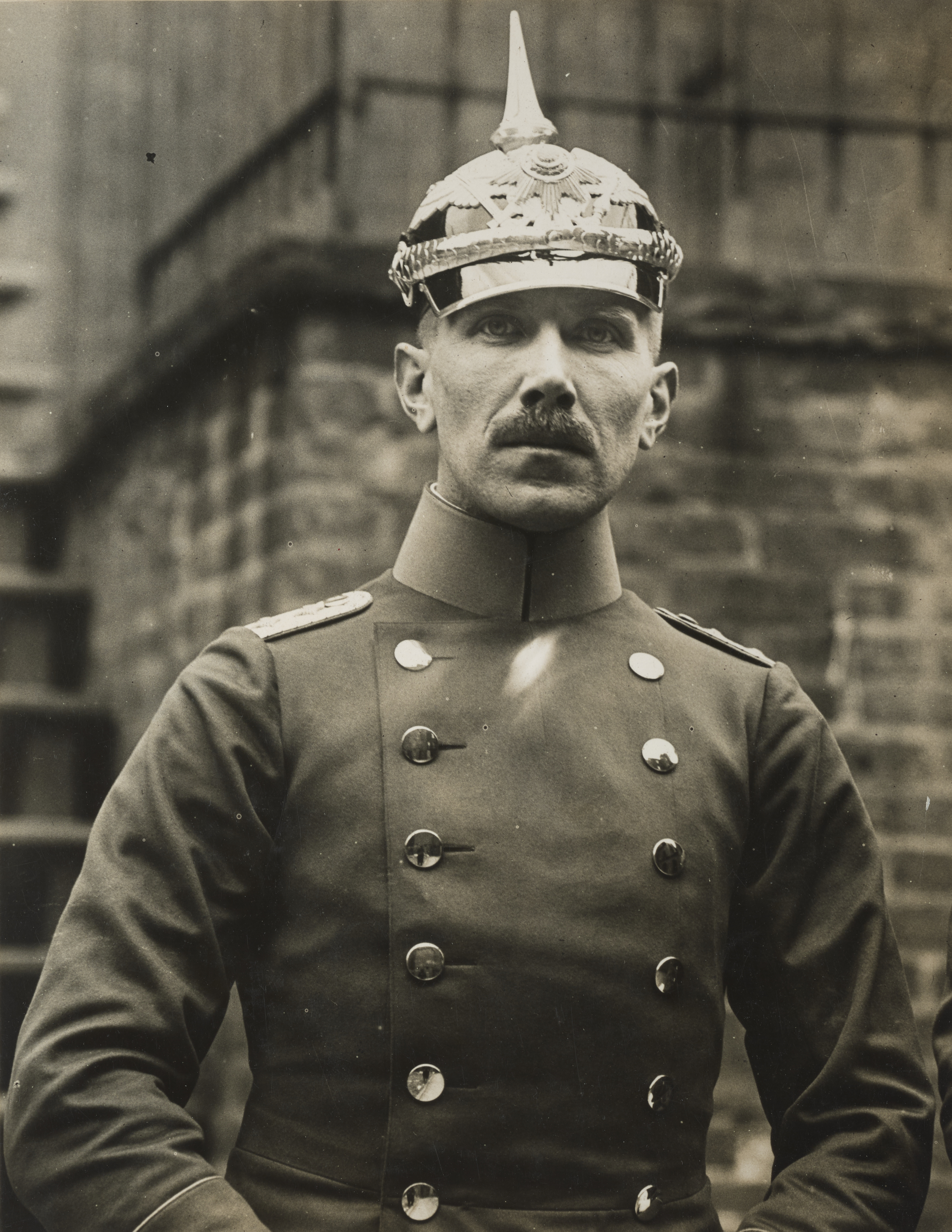
Papen as German military attaché for Washington, D.C.

On 30 July 1914, Papen arrived in Washington, D.C., from Mexico to take up his post as German military attaché to the United States. During World War I, Papen attempted to buy weapons for Germany in the United States, but the British Blockade made shipping arms to Germany almost impossible. On 22 August 1914, Papen hired US private detective Paul Koenig, based in New York City, to conduct a sabotage and bombing campaign against businesses in New York owned by citizens from the Allied nations. Papen, who was given an unlimited fund of cash to draw on by Berlin, attempted to block the British, French and Russian governments from buying war supplies in the United States. Papen set up a front company that tried to preclusively purchase every hydraulic press in the United States for the next two years to limit artillery shell production by United States firms with contracts with the Allies. To enable German citizens living in the Americas to return to Germany, Papen set up an operation in New York to forge United States passports.

Starting in September 1914, Papen abused his diplomatic immunity as German military attaché, violating US laws to start organising plans for incursions into Canada for a campaign of sabotage against canals, bridges and railroads. In October 1914, Papen became involved with what was later dubbed "the Hindu–German Conspiracy", by covertly arranging with Indian nationalists based in California for arms trafficking to the latter for a planned uprising against the British Raj. In February 1915, Papen also covertly organised the Vanceboro international bridge bombing, in which his diplomatic immunity protected him from arrest. At the same time, he remained involved in plans to restore Huerta to power and arranged for the arming and financing of a planned invasion of Mexico.

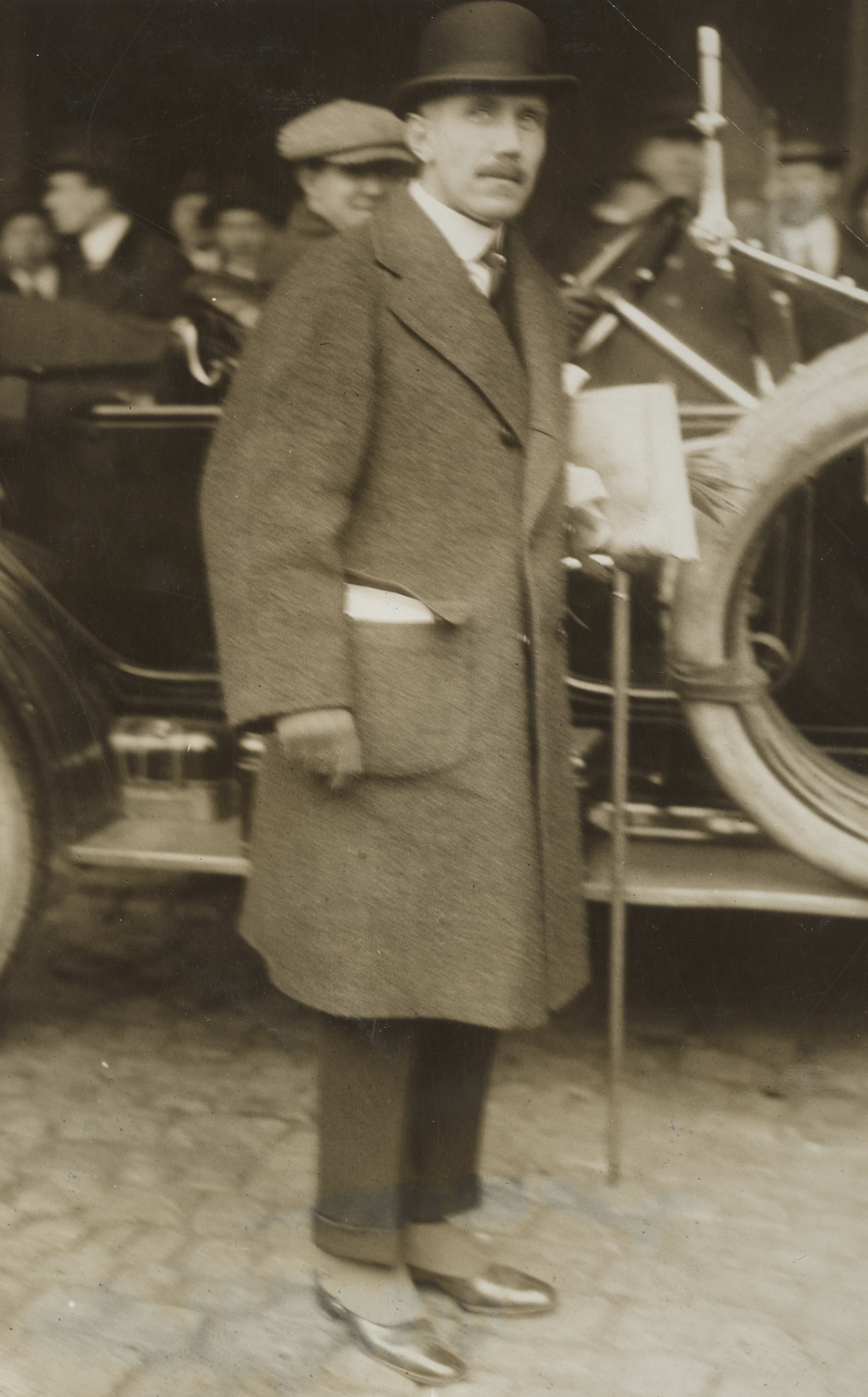
Papen departing New York City in December 1915, after being declared persona non grata by the U.S. government and recalled to Germany

Papen's covert operations were known to British intelligence, which shared its information with the United States government. His correspondence and other materials had been translated by Mary Jenkins, a graduate in German from University of Oxford. He had kept his chequebook stubs, which provided the names of spies he had employed. As a result, for complicity in the planning of acts of sabotage the United States government declared Papen persona non grata on 3 December 1915. He was recalled to Germany and, upon his return, he was awarded the Iron Cross.

Papen remained involved in covert operations in the Americas. In February 1916, he contacted Mexican Colonel Gonzalo Enrile, living in Cuba, in an attempt to arrange German support for Félix Díaz, the would-be strongman of Mexico. Papen served as an intermediary between Roger Casement of the Irish Volunteers and German naval intelligence for the purchase and delivery of arms to be used in Dublin during the Easter Rising of 1916. He remained involved in further covert operations with Indian nationalists as well. In April 1916, a US federal grand jury returned an indictment against Papen for a plot to blow up Canada's Welland Canal; he remained under indictment until he became Chancellor of Germany in mid-1932, at which time the charges were dropped.

== Army service in World War I ==
While Papen belonged to the Centre Party, the centrist party that almost all German Catholics supported, the nationalist conservative Papen became estranged from the party during the course of the war. Papen disapproved of Matthias Erzberger's cooperation with Social Democrats, and regarded the Reichstag Peace Resolution of 19 July 1917 as almost treason.

Later in World War I, Papen returned to the army on active service, at first on the Western Front. In 1916, Papen took command of the 2nd Battalion of the 93rd Reserve Infantry Regiment of the 4th Guards Infantry Division fighting in Flanders. On 22 August 1916, Papen's battalion took heavy losses while successfully resisting a British attack during the Battle of the Somme. Between November 1916 and February 1917, Papen's battalion was engaged in almost continuous heavy fighting. He was awarded the Iron Cross, 1st Class. On 11 April 1917, Papen fought at Vimy Ridge, where his battalion was defeated with heavy losses by the Canadian Corps.

After Vimy, Papen asked for a transfer to the Middle East, which was approved. From June 1917 Papen served as an officer on the General Staff in the Middle East, and then as an officer attached to the Ottoman army in Palestine. During his time in Constantinople, Papen befriended Joachim von Ribbentrop. Between October and December 1917, Papen took part in the heavy fighting in the Sinai and Palestine Campaign. He was promoted to the rank of Oberstleutnant.

After the Turks signed an armistice with the Allies on 30 October 1918, the German Asia Corps was ordered home. Papen was in the mountains at Karapinar when he heard on 11 November 1918 that the war was over. The new republic ordered soldiers' councils to be organised in the German Army, including the Asian corps, which General Otto Liman von Sanders attempted to obey, and which Papen refused to obey. Sanders ordered Papen arrested for his insubordination, which caused Papen to leave his post without permission as he fled to Germany in civilian clothing to personally meet Field Marshal Paul von Hindenburg, who had the charges dropped.

== Entry into politics ==
After leaving the German Army in the spring of 1919, Papen purchased the Haus Merfeld, a country estate in Dülmen, and became a gentleman farmer. In April 1920, during the Communist uprising in the Ruhr, Papen took command of a Freikorps unit to protect Catholicism from the "Red marauders". Impressed with his leadership of his Freikorps unit, Papen was urged to pursue a career in politics. In the fall of 1920, the president of the Westphalian Farmer's Association, Baron Engelbert von Kerkerinck zur Borg, told Papen his association would campaign for him if he ran for the Prussian Landtag.

Papen entered politics and renewed his connection with the Centre Party. As a monarchist, Papen positioned himself as part of the national conservative wing of the party that rejected both republicanism and the Weimar Coalition with the Social Democratic Party of Germany (SPD). In reality, Papen's political ideology was much closer to that of the German National People's Party (DNVP) and he seems to have belonged to the Centre Party out of loyalty to the Catholic Church in Germany and in the hope that he could shift his party's platform towards restoring the constitutional monarchy deposed in 1918. Despite this ambiguity, Papen was undoubtedly a highly powerful dealmaker within the political party, particularly as the largest shareholder and the chief of the editorial board in the party's Catholic newspaper Germania, the most prestigious of the German Catholic media sources at the time.

Papen was a member of the Landtag of Prussia from 1921 to 1928 and from 1930 to 1932, representing a heavily Catholic constituency in rural Westphalia. However, he rarely attended Landtag sessions and never spoke at them during his elected mandate. He subsequently tried to have his name entered as a candidate for the Centre Party for the Reichstag elections of May 1924, but this was blocked by the party leadership. In February 1925, Papen was one of the six Centre deputies in the Landtag who voted with the German National People's Party and the German People's Party against the SPD-Centre coalition government. Papen was nearly expelled from the party for disobeying orders from his party leadership through his votes in the Landtag. In the 1925 presidential elections, Papen surprised his party by supporting the DNVP candidate Paul von Hindenburg over the Centre Party's own candidate Wilhelm Marx. Papen, along with two of his future cabinet ministers, was a member of Arthur Moeller van den Bruck's exclusive Berlin Deutscher Herrenklub (German Gentlemen's Club).

In March 1930, Papen welcomed the coming of presidential government. But with Chancellor Heinrich Brüning's presidential government's dependence upon the Social Democrats in the Reichstag to "tolerate" it by not voting to cancel laws passed under Article 48, Papen grew more critical. In a speech before a group of farmers in October 1931, Papen called for Brüning to disallow the SPD and base his presidential government on "tolerance" from the NSDAP instead. Papen demanded that Brüning transform the "concealed dictatorship" of a presidential government into a dictatorship that would unite all of the German right under its banner. In the March–April 1932 German presidential election, Papen voted for Hindenburg on the grounds he was the best man to unite the right, while in the Prussian Landtag's election for the Landtag speaker, Papen voted for the Nazi Hans Kerrl.

== Chancellorship ==
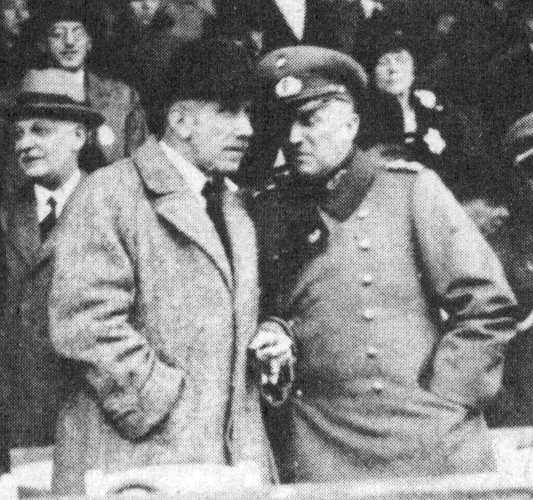
Papen (left) with his eventual successor, Kurt von Schleicher (right), watching a horse race in Berlin-Karlshorst

On 1 June 1932, Papen was suddenly promoted to high office when President Hindenburg appointed him chancellor, an appointment he owed to General Kurt von Schleicher, an old friend from the pre-war General Staff, and an influential advisor of President Hindenburg. Schleicher selected Papen because his conservative, aristocratic background and military career made him acceptable to Hindenburg and would create the groundwork for a possible coalition between the Centre Party and the Nazis. It was Schleicher, who himself became Defence Minister, who was responsible for selecting the entire cabinet. The day before, Papen had promised party chairman Ludwig Kaas he would not accept any appointment. After Papen broke his pledge, Kaas branded him the "Ephialtes of the Centre Party", after the infamous traitor of the Battle of Thermopylae. On 31 May 1932, in order to forestall being expelled from the party, Papen resigned from it.

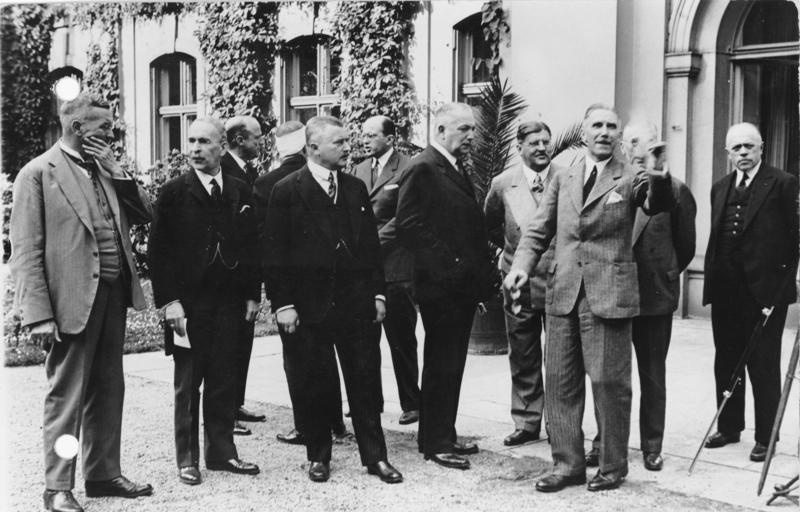
Papen's cabinet on 2 June 1932

The cabinet over which Papen presided was labelled the "cabinet of barons" or "cabinet of monocles". Papen had little support in the Reichstag; the only parties committed to supporting him were the national conservative German National People's Party (DNVP) and the conservative liberal German People's Party (DVP). The Centre Party refused its support for him on account of his betrayal of Chancellor Brüning. Schleicher's planned Centre-Nazi coalition thus failed to materialise, and the Nazis now had little reason to prop up Papen's weak government. Papen grew very close to Hindenburg and first met Adolf Hitler in June 1932.

Papen consented on 31 May to Hitler's and Hindenburg's agreement of 30 May that the Nazi Party would tolerate Papen's government if fresh elections were called, the ban on the Sturmabteilung (SA) was cancelled, and the Nazis were granted access to the radio network. As agreed, the Papen government dissolved the Reichstag on 4 June and called a national election by 31 July 1932, in the hope that the Nazis would win the largest number of seats in the Reichstag, which would allow him the majority he needed to establish an authoritarian government. In a so-called "presidential government", Papen would rule by Article 48, having emergency decrees signed by President Hindenburg. On 16 June 1932, the new government lifted the ban on the SA and the Schutzstaffel (SS), eliminating the last remaining rationale for Nazi support for Papen.

In June and July 1932, Papen represented Germany at the Lausanne conference where, on 9 July, an agreement was reached for Germany to make a one-time payment of 3 million Reichsmarks in bonds to the Bank for International Settlements. The redemption of the bonds, which would not start for at least three years, was to be the last of Germany's reparations payments. Papen nevertheless immediately repudiated the commitment upon his return to Berlin. The treaty signed at the Lausanne Conference was not ratified by any of the countries involved, and Germany never resumed paying reparations after the expiration of the Hoover Moratorium in 1932.

Through Article 48, Papen enacted on 4 September economic policies that cut the payments offered by the unemployment insurance fund, subjected jobless Germans seeking unemployment insurance to a means test, and lowered wages (including those reached by collective bargaining), while arranging tax cuts for corporations and the rich. These austerity policies made Papen deeply unpopular with the general population but had the backing of the business elite.

Negotiations between the Nazis, the Centre Party, and Papen for a new Prussian government began on 8 June but broke down due to the Centre Party's hostility to its deserter Papen. On 11 July 1932, Papen received the support of the cabinet and the President for a decree allowing the national government to take over the Prussian government, which was dominated by the SPD. This move was later justified through the false rumour that the Social Democrats and the Communist Party of Germany (KPD) were planning a merger. The political violence of the so-called Altona Bloody Sunday clash between Nazis, Communists, and the police on 17 July gave Papen his pretext. On 20 July, Papen launched a coup against the SPD coalition government of Prussia in the so-called Preußenschlag (Prussian Coup). Berlin was put on military lockdown, and Papen informed the members of the Prussian cabinet that they were being removed from office. Papen declared himself Commissioner (Reichskommissar) of Prussia by way of another emergency decree that he elicited from Hindenburg, further weakening the democracy of the Weimar Republic. Papen viewed the coup as a gift to the Nazis, who had been informed of it by 9 July, and were now supposed to support his government.

On 23 July, Papen instructed German representatives to walk out of the World Disarmament Conference after the French delegation warned that allowing Germany Gleichberechtigung ("equality of status") in armaments would lead to another world war. Papen stated that Germany would not return to the conference until the other powers agreed to consider his demand for equal status.

In the Reichstag election of 31 July, the Nazis won the largest number of seats. To combat the rise in SA and SS political terrorism that began right after the elections, Papen on 9 August brought in via Article 48 a new law that drastically streamlined the judicial process in death penalty cases while limiting the right of appeal. New special courts were also created. A few hours later in the town of Potempa, five SA men murdered Communist labourer Konrad Pietrzuch. The "Potempa Five" were promptly arrested, then convicted and sentenced to death on 23 August by a special court. The Potempa case generated enormous media attention, and Hitler made it clear that he would not support Papen's government if the "Five" were executed. On 2 September, Papen, in his capacity as Commissioner of Prussia, acquiesced to Hitler's demands and commuted the sentences of the "Five" to life imprisonment.

On 11 August, the public holiday of Constitution Day, which commemorated the adoption of the Weimar Constitution in 1919, Papen and his Interior Minister Baron Wilhelm von Gayl called a press conference to announce plans for a new constitution that would, in effect, turn Germany into a dictatorship. Two days later, Schleicher and Papen offered the position of vice-chancellor to Hitler, who rejected it.

Papen arriving for the Reichstag session of 12 September 1932

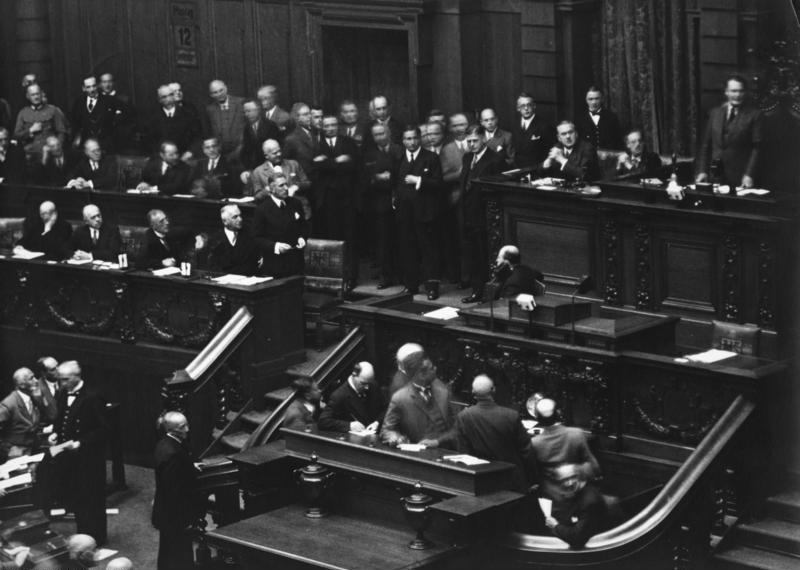
Papen (standing, left) demands the floor and is ignored by Speaker Hermann Göring (right) in the Reichstag on 12 September 1932.

When the new Reichstag assembled on 12 September, Papen hoped to destroy the growing alliance between the Nazis and the Centre Party. That day at the President's estate in Neudeck, Papen, Schleicher, and Gayl obtained in advance from Hindenburg a decree to dissolve the Reichstag, then secured another decree to suspend elections beyond the constitutional 60 days. The Communists tabled a motion of no confidence in the Papen government. Papen had anticipated this move by the Communists, but had been assured that there would be an immediate objection. However, when no one objected, Papen placed the red folder containing the dissolution decree on Reichstag president Hermann Göring's desk. He demanded the floor in order to read it, but Göring pretended not to see him; the Nazis and the Centre Party had decided to support the Communist motion. The motion carried by 512 votes to 42. Realising that he did not have nearly enough support to go through with his plan to suspend elections, Papen decided to call another election to punish the Reichstag for the vote of no-confidence.

On 27 October, the Supreme Court of Germany issued a ruling that Papen's coup, deposing the Prussian government, was illegal, but allowed Papen to retain control of Prussia. In November 1932, Papen violated the terms of the Treaty of Versailles by approving a program of refurbishment for the German Navy of an aircraft carrier, six battleships, six cruisers, six destroyer flotillas, and 16 submarines, intended to allow Germany to control both the North Sea and the Baltic.

In the November 1932 election, the Nazis lost seats, but Papen was still unable to secure a Reichstag that could be counted on not to pass another vote of no-confidence in his government. Papen's attempt to negotiate with Hitler failed. Under pressure from Schleicher, Papen resigned on 17 November and formed a caretaker government. He told his cabinet that he planned to have martial law declared, which would allow him to rule as a dictator. However, at a cabinet meeting on 2 December, Papen was informed by Schleicher's associate General Eugen Ott about the dubious results of Reichswehr war games, that showed there was no way to maintain order against the Nazis and Communists. Realizing that Schleicher was moving to replace him, Papen asked Hindenburg to dismiss Schleicher as Defence Minister. Instead, Hindenburg appointed Schleicher as chancellor.

== Bringing Hitler to power ==
Following his resignation, Papen regularly visited Hindenburg, missing no opportunity to attack Schleicher in these visits. Schleicher had promised Hindenburg that he would never attack Papen in public when he became chancellor, but in a bid to distance himself from the very unpopular Papen, Schleicher, in a series of speeches in December 1932 and January 1933, did just that, upsetting Hindenburg. Papen was embittered by the way his former best friend, Schleicher, had brought him down, and was determined to become chancellor again. On 4 January 1933, Hitler and Papen met in secret at the banker Kurt Baron von Schröder's house in Cologne to discuss a common strategy against Schleicher.

On 9 January 1933, Papen and Hindenburg agreed to form a new government that would bring in Hitler. On the evening of 22 January in a meeting at the villa of Joachim von Ribbentrop in Berlin, Papen made the concession of abandoning his claim to the chancellorship and committed to support Hitler as chancellor in a proposed "Government of National Concentration", in which Papen would serve as vice-chancellor and Minister-President of Prussia. On 23 January, Papen presented to Hindenburg his idea for Hitler to be made chancellor, while keeping him "boxed" in. On the same day, Schleicher, to avoid a vote of no-confidence in the Reichstag when it reconvened on 31 January, asked the president to declare a state of emergency. Hindenburg declined and Schleicher resigned at midday on 28 January. Hindenburg formally gave Papen the task of forming a new government.

In the morning of 29 January 1933, Papen met with Hitler and Hermann Göring at his apartment, where it was agreed that Papen would serve as vice-chancellor and Commissioner for Prussia. It was in the same meeting that Papen first learned that Hitler wanted to dissolve the Reichstag when he became chancellor and, once the Nazis had won a majority of the seats in the ensuing elections, to activate the Enabling Act in order to be able to enact laws without the involvement of the Reichstag. When the people around Papen voiced their concerns about putting Hitler in power, he asked them, "What do you want?" and reassured them, "I have the confidence of Hindenburg! In two months, we'll have pushed Hitler so far into the corner that he'll squeal."

Editor-in-Chief Theodor Wolff commented in an editorial in the Berliner Tagblatt on 29 January 1933: "The strongest natures, those with the iron forehead or the board before the head, will insist on the anti-parliamentary solution, on the closing of the Reichstag House, on the coup d'état."

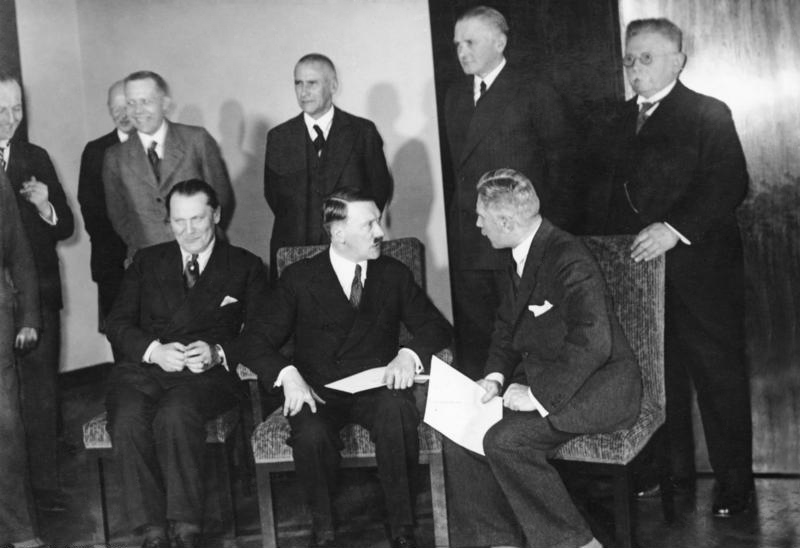
Papen with the other Hitler cabinet members on 30 January 1933

In the end, the president, who had previously vowed never to let Hitler become chancellor, appointed Hitler to the post at 11:30 am on 30 January 1933, with Papen as vice-chancellor. While Papen's intrigues appeared to have brought Hitler into power, the crucial dynamic was in fact provided by the Nazi Party's electoral support, which made military dictatorship the only alternative to Nazi rule for Hindenburg and his circle.

At the formation of Hitler's cabinet on 30 January 1933, only three Nazis held cabinet portfolios: Hitler, Göring, and Wilhelm Frick. The other eight posts were held by conservatives close to Papen, including the DNVP chairman, Alfred Hugenberg. Additionally, as part of the deal that allowed Hitler to become chancellor, Papen was granted the right to attend every meeting between Hitler and Hindenburg. Moreover, cabinet decisions were made by majority vote. Papen naively believed that his conservative friends' majority in the cabinet and his closeness to Hindenburg would keep Hitler in check.

== Vice-chancellor ==
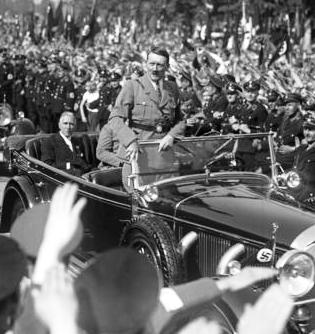
Papen with Hitler on 1 May 1933

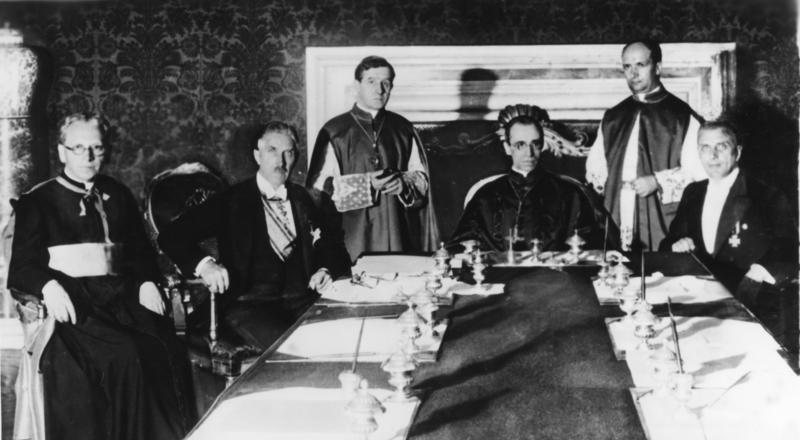
Papen at the signing of the Reichskonkordat in Rome on 20 July 1933

Hitler and his allies instead quickly marginalised Papen and the rest of the cabinet. For example, as part of the deal between Hitler and Papen, Göring had been appointed interior minister of Prussia, thus putting the largest police force in Germany under Nazi control. Göring frequently acted without consulting his nominal superior, Papen. On 1 February 1933, Hitler presented to the cabinet an Article 48 decree law that had been drafted by Papen in November 1932, allowing the police to take people into "protective custody" without charges. It was signed into law by Hindenburg on 4 February 1933 as the "Decree for the Protection of the German People".

On the evening of 27 February 1933, Papen joined Hitler, Göring and Goebbels at the burning Reichstag and told him that he shared their belief that this was the signal for Communist revolution. On 18 March 1933, in his capacity as Reich Commissioner for Prussia, Papen freed the "Potempa Five" on the grounds that the murder of Konrad Pietzuch was an act of self-defence, making the five SA men "innocent victims" of a miscarriage of justice. Neither Papen nor his conservative allies waged a fight against the Reichstag Fire Decree in late February or the Enabling Act in March. After the Enabling Act was passed, serious deliberations more or less ceased at cabinet meetings, if they took place at all, which subsequently neutralised Papen's attempt to "box" Hitler in through cabinet-based decision-making.

At the Reichstag election of 5 March 1933, Papen was elected as a deputy in an electoral alliance with Hugenberg's DNVP. Papen endorsed Hitler's plan, presented at a cabinet meeting on 7 March 1933, to destroy the Centre Party by severing the Catholic Church from it. This was the origin of the Reichskonkordat that Papen was to negotiate with the Catholic Church later in the spring of 1933. On 5 April 1933, Papen founded a new political party called the League of German Catholics Cross and Eagle, which was intended as a conservative Catholic party that would hold the NSDAP in check while at the same time working with the NSDAP. Both the Centre Party and the Bavarian People's Party declined to merge into Papen's new party, while the rival Coalition of Catholic Germans, which was sponsored by the NSDAP, proved more effective at recruiting German Catholics.

On 8 April 1933, Papen travelled to the Vatican to offer a Reichskonkordat that defined the German state's relationship with the Catholic Church. During his stay in Rome, Papen met the Italian Prime Minister Benito Mussolini and failed to persuade him to drop his support for the Austrian chancellor Dollfuss. Papen was euphoric at the Reichskonkordat that he negotiated with Cardinal Eugenio Pacelli in Rome, believing that this was a diplomatic success that restored his status in Germany, guaranteed the rights of German Catholics in the Third Reich, and required the disbandment of the Centre Party and the Bavarian People's Party, thereby achieving one of Papen's main political goals since June 1932. During Papen's absence, the Landtag of Prussia elected Hermann Göring as prime minister on 10 April. Papen saw the end of the Centre Party that he had engineered as one of his greatest achievements. Later in May 1933, he was forced to disband the League of German Catholics Cross and Eagle owing to a lack of public interest.

In September 1933, Papen visited Budapest to meet the Hungarian Prime Minister Gyula Gömbös, and to discuss how Germany and Hungary might best co-operate against Czechoslovakia. The Hungarians wanted the volksdeutsche (ethnic German) minorities in the Banat, Transylvania, Slovakia and Carpathia to agitate to return to Hungary in co-operation with the Magyar minorities, a demand that Papen refused to meet. In September 1933, when the Soviet Union ended its secret military co-operation with Germany, the Soviets justified their move because Papen had informed the French of the Soviet support for German violations of the Versailles Treaty.

On 3 October 1933, Papen was named a member of the Academy for German Law at its inaugural meeting. Then, on 14 November 1933, Papen was appointed the Reich Commissioner for the Saar. The Saarland was under the rule of the League of Nations and a referendum was scheduled for 1935 under which the Saarlanders had the option to return to Germany, join France or retain the status quo. As a conservative Catholic whose wife was from the Saarland, Papen had much understanding of the heavily Catholic region, and he gave numerous speeches urging the Saarlanders to vote to return to Germany. Papen was successful in persuading the majority of the Catholic clergy in the Saarland to campaign for a return to Germany, and 90% of the Saarland voted to return to Germany in the 1935 referendum.

Papen began covert talks with other conservative forces with the aim of convincing Hindenburg to restore the balance of power to the conservatives. By May 1934, it had become clear that Hindenburg was dying, with doctors telling Papen that the president only had a few months left to live. Papen, together with Otto Meissner, Hindenburg's chief of staff, and Major Oskar von Hindenburg, Hindenburg's son, drafted a "political will and last testament", which the president signed on 11 May 1934. At Papen's request, the will called for the dismissal of certain Nazi ministers from the cabinet, and regular cabinet meetings, which would have achieved Papen's plan of January 1933 for a broad governing coalition of the right.

=== Marburg speech ===
The Aula of the Alte Universität, where Papen delivered the speech

With the Army command recently having hinted at the need for Hitler to control the SA, Papen delivered an address at the University of Marburg on 17 June 1934, where he called for the restoration of some freedoms, demanded an end to the calls for a "second revolution" and advocated the cessation of SA terror in the streets. Papen intended to "tame" Hitler with the Marburg speech, and gave the speech without any effort at coordination beforehand with either Hindenburg or the Reichswehr. The speech was crafted by Papen's speech writer, Edgar Julius Jung, with the assistance of Papen's secretary Herbert von Bose and Catholic leader Erich Klausener, and Papen had first seen the text of the speech only two hours before he delivered it at the University of Marburg. The "Marburg speech" was well received by the graduating students of Marburg University, who all loudly cheered the vice-chancellor. Extracts were reproduced in the Frankfurter Zeitung, the most prestigious newspaper in Germany, and from there picked up by the foreign press.

The speech incensed Hitler, and its publication was suppressed by the Propaganda Ministry. Papen told Hitler that unless the ban on the Marburg speech was lifted and Hitler declared himself willing to follow the line recommended by Papen in the speech, he would resign and would inform Hindenburg why he had resigned. Hitler outwitted Papen by telling him that he agreed with all of the criticism of his regime made in the Marburg speech; told him Goebbels was wrong to ban the speech and he would have the ban lifted at once; and promised that the SA would be put in their place, provided Papen agreed not to resign and would meet with Hindenburg in a joint interview with him. Papen accepted Hitler's suggestions.

=== Night of the Long Knives ===
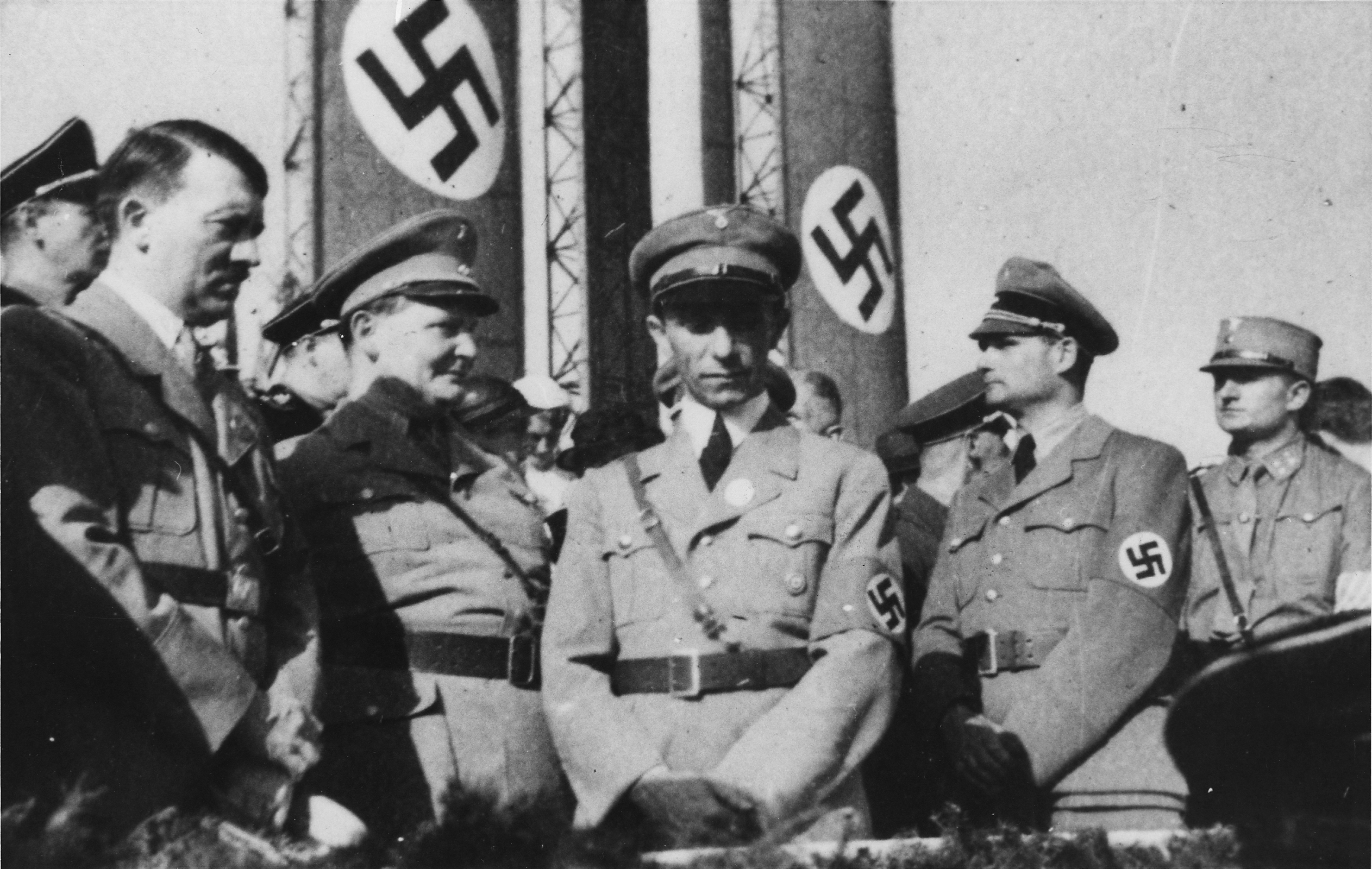
The architects of the purge: Hitler, Göring, Goebbels, and Hess. Only Himmler and Heydrich are missing.

Two weeks after the Marburg speech, Hitler responded to the armed forces' demands to suppress the ambitions of Ernst Röhm and the SA by purging the SA leadership. The purge, known as the Night of the Long Knives, took place between 30 June and 2 July 1934. Though Papen's bold speech against some of the excesses committed by the Nazis had angered Hitler, the latter was aware that he could not act directly against the vice-chancellor without offending Hindenburg. Instead, in the Night of the Long Knives, the Vice-Chancellery, Papen's office, was ransacked by the Schutzstaffel (SS); his associates Herbert von Bose, Erich Klausener and Edgar Julius Jung were shot. Papen himself was placed under house arrest at his villa with his telephone line cut. Some accounts indicate that this "protective custody" was ordered by Göring, who felt the ex-diplomat could be useful in the future.

Reportedly, Papen arrived at the Chancellery, exhausted from days of house arrest without sleep, to find the chancellor seated with other Nazi ministers around a round table, with no place for Papen but a hole in the middle. He insisted on a private audience with Hitler and announced his resignation, stating, "My service to the Fatherland is over!" The following day, Papen's resignation as vice-chancellor was formally accepted and publicised, with no successor appointed. When Hindenburg died on 2 August, the last conservative obstacle to complete Nazi rule was gone.

== Ambassador to Austria ==
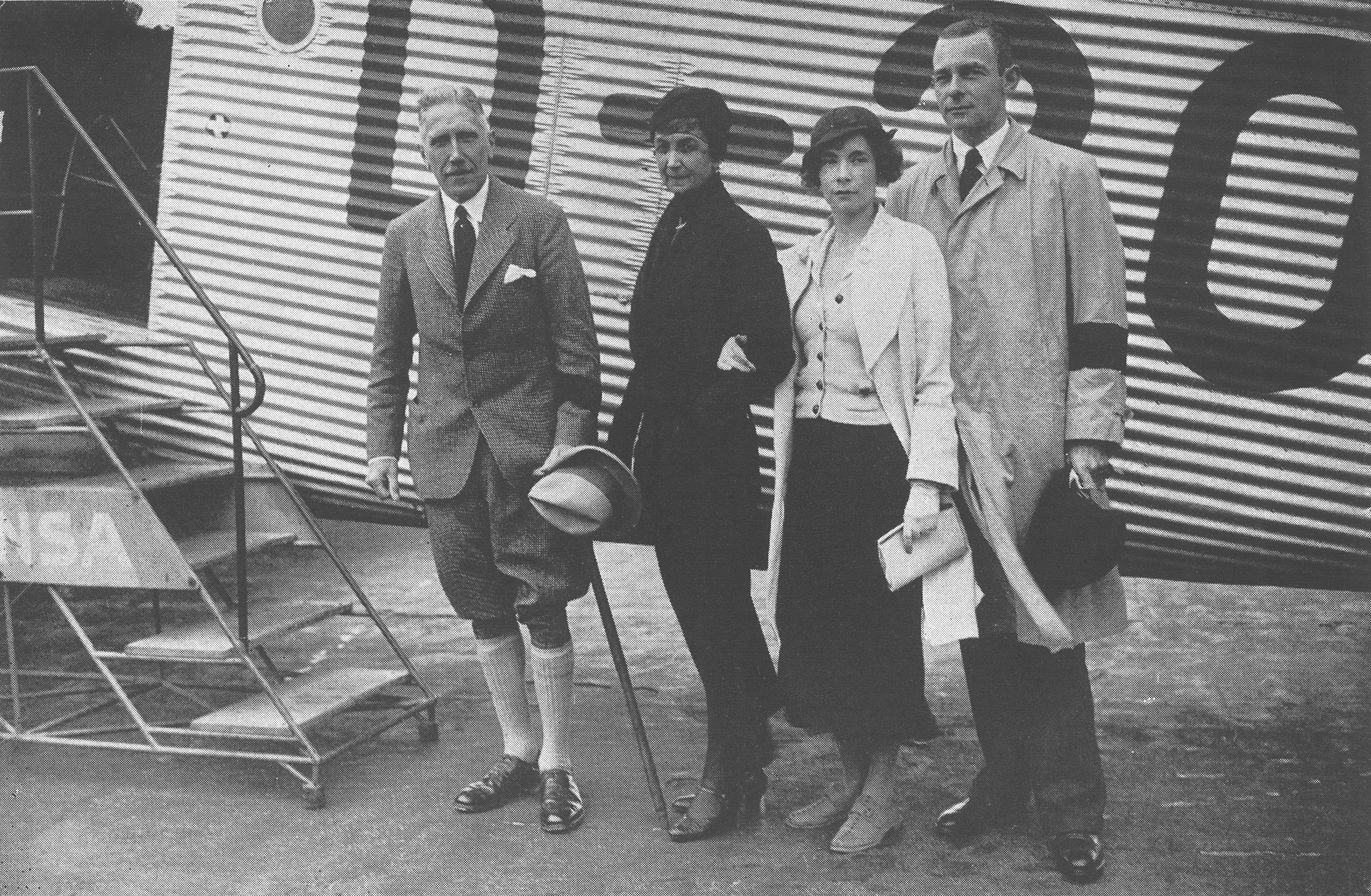
Papen at Berlin Tempelhof Airport in July 1934, just before departing for Vienna

Hitler offered Papen the assignment of German ambassador to Vienna, which Papen accepted. Papen was a German nationalist who always believed that Austria was destined to join Germany in an Anschluss (annexation), and felt that a success in bringing that about might restore his career. During his time as ambassador to Austria, Papen stood outside the normal chain of command of the Auswärtiges Amt (Foreign Office) as he refused to take orders from Konstantin von Neurath, his own former Foreign Minister. Instead, Papen reported directly to Hitler.

Papen often met with Austrian Chancellor Kurt von Schuschnigg to assure him that Germany did not wish to annex his country, and only wanted the banned Austrian Nazi Party to participate in Austrian politics. In late 1934-early 1935, Papen took a break from his duties as German ambassador in Vienna to lead the Deutsche Front ("German Front") in the Saarland plebiscite on 13 January 1935, where the League of Nations observers monitoring the vote noted Papen's "ruthless methods" as he campaigned for the region to return to Germany.

Papen also contributed to achieving Hitler's goal of undermining Austrian sovereignty and bringing about the Anschluss. On 28 August 1935, Papen negotiated a deal under which the German press would cease its attacks on the Austrian government, in return for which the Austrian press would cease its attacks on Germany's. Papen played a major role in negotiating the 1936 Austro-German agreement under which Austria declared itself a "German state" whose foreign policy would always be aligned with Berlin's and allowed for members of the "national opposition" to enter the Austrian cabinet in exchange for which the Austrian Nazis abandoned their terrorist campaign against the government. The treaty Papen signed in Vienna on 11 July 1936 promised that Germany would not seek to annex Austria and largely placed Austria in the German sphere of influence, greatly reducing Italian influence on Austria. In July 1936, Papen reported to Hitler that the Austro-German treaty he had just signed was the "decisive step" towards ending Austrian independence, and it was only a matter of time before the Anschluss took place.

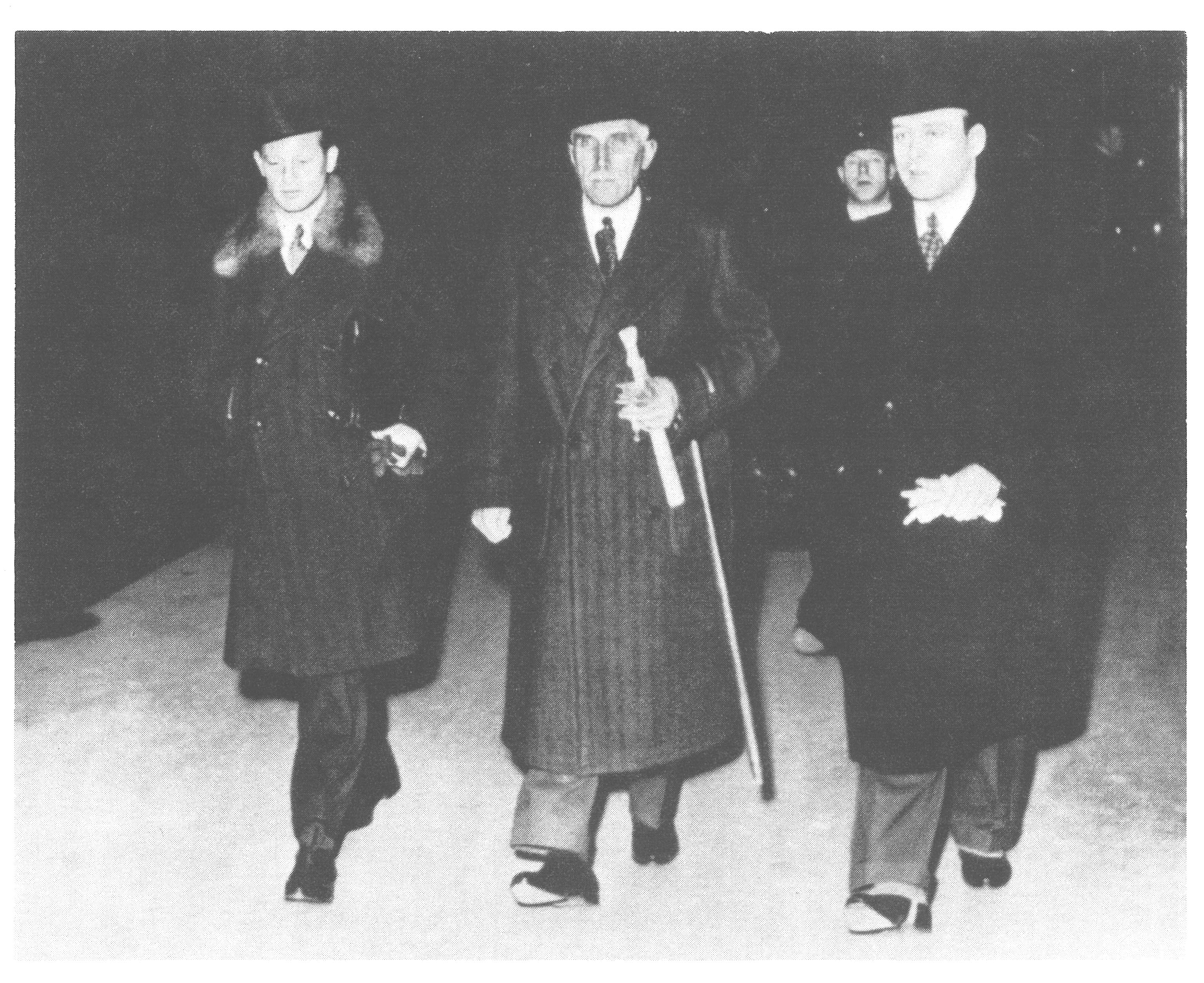
Papen on his way to Berchtesgaden, 21 February 1938

In the summer and fall of 1937, Papen pressured the Austrians to include more Nazis in the government. In September 1937, Papen returned to Berlin when Benito Mussolini visited Germany, serving as Hitler's adviser on Italo-German talks about Austria. Papen joined the Nazi Party in 1938. Papen was dismissed from his mission in Austria on 4 February 1938, but Hitler drafted him to arrange a meeting between the German dictator and Kurt Schuschnigg at Berchtesgaden. The ultimatum that Hitler presented to Schuschnigg at the meeting on 12 February 1938 led to the Austrian government's capitulation to German threats and pressure, and paved the way for the Anschluss that year.

== Ambassador to Turkey ==
Papen later served the German government as Ambassador to Turkey from 1939 to 1944. In April 1938, after the retirement of the previous ambassador, Friedrich von Keller on his 65th birthday, the German foreign minister Joachim von Ribbentrop attempted to appoint Papen as ambassador in Ankara, but the appointment was vetoed by the Turkish president Mustafa Kemal Atatürk who remembered Papen well with considerable distaste when he had served alongside him in World War I. In November 1938 and in February 1939, the new Turkish president, General İsmet İnönü, again vetoed Ribbentrop's attempts to have Papen appointed as German ambassador to Turkey. In April 1939, Turkey accepted Papen as ambassador. Papen was keen to return to Turkey, where he had served during World War I.

Papen arrived in Turkey on 27 April 1939, just after the signing of a UK-Turkish declaration of friendship. İnönü wanted Turkey to join the UK-inspired "peace front" that was meant to stop Germany. On 24 June 1939, France and Turkey signed a declaration committing them to upholding collective security in the Balkans. On 21 August 1939, Papen presented Turkey with a diplomatic note threatening economic sanctions and the cancellation of all arms contracts if Turkey did not cease leaning towards joining the UK-French "peace front", a threat that Turkey rebuffed.

On 1 September 1939, Germany invaded Poland, and two days later, on 3 September 1939, the UK and France declared war on Germany. Papen claimed later to have been opposed to Hitler's foreign policy in 1939, and was very depressed when he heard the news of the German attack on Poland on the radio. Papen continued his work of representing the Reich in Turkey on the grounds that resigning in protest "would indicate the moral weakening in Germany", which was something he could never do.

On 19 October 1939, Papen suffered a notable setback when Turkey signed a treaty of alliance with France and the United Kingdom. During the Phoney War, the conservative Catholic Papen found himself, to his own discomfort, working together with Soviet diplomats in Ankara to pressure Turkey not to enter the war on the Allied side. In June 1940, with France's defeat, İnönü abandoned his pro-Allied neutrality, and Papen's influence in Ankara dramatically increased.

Between 1940 and 1942, Papen signed three economic agreements that placed Turkey in the German economic sphere of influence. Papen hinted more than once to Turkey that Germany was prepared to support Bulgarian claims to Thrace if Turkey did not prove more accommodating to Germany. In May 1941, when the Germans dispatched an expeditionary force to Iraq to fight against the United Kingdom in the Anglo-Iraqi War, Papen persuaded Turkey to allow arms in Syria to be shipped along a railroad linking Syria to Iraq. In June 1941, Papen successfully negotiated a Treaty of Friendship and Non-aggression with Turkey, signed on 17 June 1941, which prevented Turkey from entering the war on the Allied side. After Operation Barbarossa, the invasion of the Soviet Union that began on 22 June 1941, Papen persuaded Turkey to close the Turkish straits to Soviet warships, but was unable to have the straits closed to Soviet merchant ships as he demanded.

Papen claimed after the war to have done everything within his power to save Turkish Jews living in countries occupied by Germany from deportation to the death camps, but an examination of the Auswärtige Amt's records does not support him. During the war, Papen used his connections with Turkish Army officers with whom he served in World War I to try to influence Turkey into joining the Axis, held parties at the German embassy which were attended by leading Turkish politicians and used "special funds" to bribe Turks into following a pro-German line. As an ambassador to Turkey, Papen survived a Soviet assassination attempt on 24 February 1942 by agents from the NKVD: a bomb exploded prematurely, killing the bomber and no one else, although Papen was slightly injured. In 1943, Papen frustrated a UK attempt to have Turkey join the war on the Allied side by getting Hitler to send a letter to Inönü assuring him that Germany had no interest in invading Turkey and by threatening to have the Luftwaffe bomb Istanbul if Turkey joined the Allies.

In the summer and fall of 1943, realising the war was lost, Papen attended secret meetings with the agents of the United States Office of Strategic Services (OSS) in Istanbul. Papen exaggerated his power in Germany to the OSS and asked for United States support to make him dictator of a post-Hitler Germany. United States President Franklin D. Roosevelt rejected the offer when he heard of it and told the OSS to stop talking to Papen. From October 1943, Papen and the German embassy gained access to the "Cicero" documents of secret agent Elyesa Bazna, including information about the Tehran Conference, which Papen revealed selectively to Inönu to strain Allied-Turkish relations. In January 1944, Papen, after learning via the "Cicero" documents of a United Kingdom plan to have the Royal Air Force use airfields in Turkey to bomb the oil fields of Ploiești in Romania, told the Turkish foreign minister Hüseyin Numan Menemencioğlu that if Turkey allowed the RAF to use Turkish air fields to bomb Ploiești, the Luftwaffe would use its bases in Bulgaria and Greece to bomb and destroy Istanbul and İzmir.

On 20 April 1944, Turkey, wishing to ingratiate itself with the Allies, ceased selling chromium to Germany. On 26 May 1944, Menemencioğlu announced that Turkey was reducing exports to Germany by 50%, and on 2 August 1944, Turkey severed diplomatic relations with Germany, forcing Papen to return to Berlin. After Pope Pius XI died in February 1939, his successor Pope Pius XII did not renew Papen's honorary title of Papal chamberlain. As nuncio, the future Pope John XXIII, Angelo Roncalli, became acquainted with Papen in Greece and Turkey during World War II. The German government considered appointing Papen as ambassador to the Holy See, but Pope Pius XII, after consulting Konrad von Preysing, Bishop of Berlin, rejected this proposal. In August 1944, Papen had his last meeting with Hitler after arriving back in Germany from Turkey. Here, Hitler awarded Papen the Knight's Cross of the War Merit Cross. In September 1944, Papen settled at his estate at Wallerfangen in the Saarland that had been given to him by his father-in-law. On 29 November 1944, Papen could hear in the distance the guns of the advancing United States Third Army, which caused him and his family to flee deeper into Germany.

== Post-war years ==
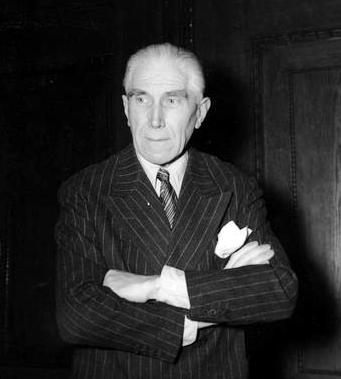
Papen at the Nuremberg trials

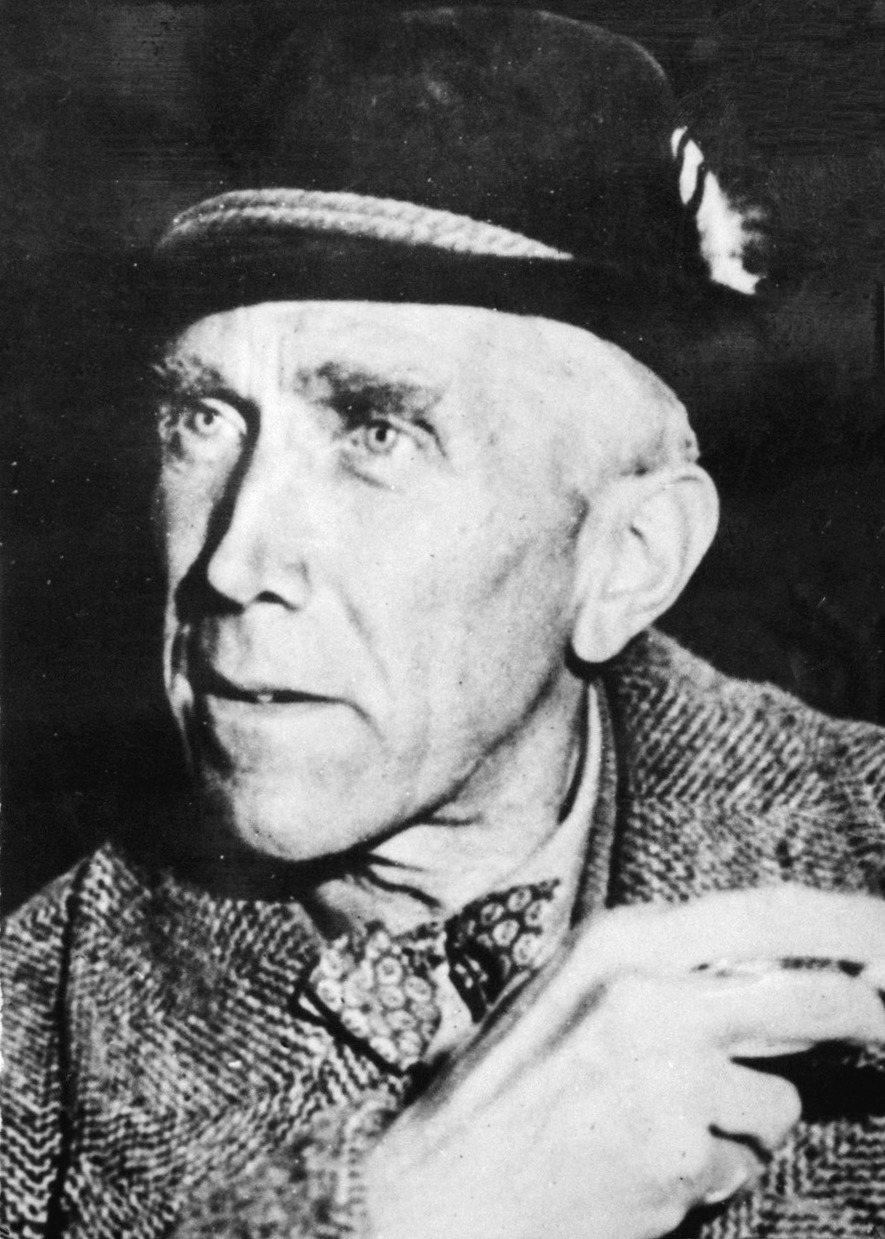
Papen in April 1964 wearing a tyrolean hat

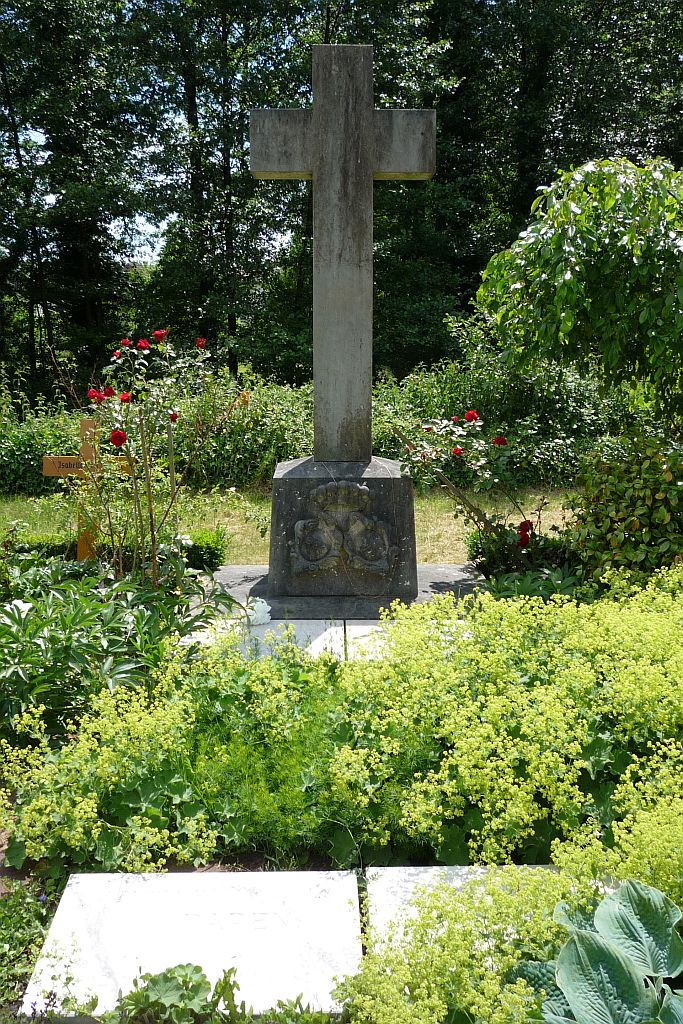
Von Papen's grave in Wallerfangen, Saarland

Papen was captured along with his son Franz Jr. at his own home on 14 April 1945. Papen was forced by the United States to visit a concentration camp to see firsthand the nature of the regime he had fostered and served from start to finish.

Papen was one of the defendants at the main Nuremberg War Crimes Trial. The investigating tribunal found no solid evidence to support claims that Papen had been involved in the annexation of Austria. The court acquitted him, stating that while he had committed a number of "political immoralities", these actions were not punishable under the "conspiracy to commit crimes against peace" written in Papen's indictment. The Soviets wanted to execute him.

Papen was subsequently sentenced to eight years' hard labour by a West German denazification court, but he was released on appeal in 1949. Until 1954, Papen was forbidden to publish in West Germany, and so he wrote a series of articles in newspapers in Spain, attacking the Federal Republic from a conservative Catholic position in much the same terms that he had attacked the Weimar Republic.

Papen unsuccessfully tried to restart his political career in the 1950s; he lived at the Castle of Benzenhofen near Ravensburg in Upper Swabia. Pope John XXIII restored his title of Papal Chamberlain on 24 July 1959. Papen was also a Knight of Malta and he was awarded the Grand Cross of the Pontifical Order of Pius IX.

Papen published a number of books and memoirs, in which he defended his policies and dealt with the years 1930 to 1933 as well as early Western Cold War politics. Papen praised the Schuman Plan to pacify relations between France and West Germany as "wise and statesmanlike" and claimed to believe in the economic and military unification and integration of Western Europe. In 1952 and 1953, Papen published his memoirs in two volumes in Switzerland.

Right up until his death in 1969, Papen gave speeches and wrote articles in the newspapers, defending himself against the charge that he had played a crucial role in having Hitler appointed chancellor and that he had served a criminal regime; these led to vitriolic exchanges with West German historians, journalists and political scientists. Franz von Papen died in Obersasbach, West Germany, on 2 May 1969 at the age of 89.

In 1941, biographer Tibor Koeves described Papen as Satan in a top hat for his role in bringing Hitler to power. Koeves described Papen as emblematic of Prussian reactionism and German militarism.

== Dramatic portrayals ==
Franz von Papen has been portrayed by these actors in these film, television and theatrical productions:

- Paul Everton in the 1918 United States film The Eagle's Eye;
- Curt Furburg in the 1943 United States film Background to Danger;
- Walter Kingsford in the 1944 United States film The Hitler Gang;
- John Wengraf in the 1952 United States film 5 Fingers;
- Peter von Zerneck in the 1973 United States TV production Portrait: A Man Whose Name Was John;
- Dennis St John in the 2000 Canadian/American TV production Nuremberg;
- Erland Josephson in the 2003 Italian/Britain TV production The Good Pope: Pope John XXIII;
- Robert Russell in the 2003 Canadian/American TV production Hitler: The Rise of Evil;
- Georgi Novakov in the 2006 United Kingdom television docudrama Nuremberg: Nazis on Trial;
- Dainius Svobonas in the 2019–2023 United Kingdom television documentary Rise of the Nazis;
- Péter Tunyogi in the 2024 TV mini-series Hitler and the Nazis: Evil on Trial;
- Burkhart Siedhoff in the 2017–2026 German neo-noir TV series Babylon Berlin.

== Publications ==
- Appell an das deutsche Gewissen. Reden zur nationalen Revolution, Stalling, Oldenburg, 1933 (OCLC 490719263);
- Memoirs (German title: Der Wahrheit eine Gasse), Translated by Brian Connell, Andre Deutsch, London, 1952 (OCLC 86049352);
- Europa, was nun? Betrachtungen zur Politik der Westmächte, Göttinger Verlags-Anstalt, Göttingen, 1954 (OCLC 4027794);
- Vom Scheitern einer Demokratie. 1930–1933, Hase und Koehler, Mainz, 1968 (OCLC 1970844).,

== See also ==
- List of Nazi Party leaders and officials

== Bibliography ==
- Bauer, Yehuda (1996). Jews for Sale?: Nazi-Jewish Negotiations, 1933–1945. New Haven: Yale University Press.
- Bisher, Jamie (2016). The Intelligence War in Latin America, 1914–1922. Jefferson: McFarland & Company.
- Braatz, Werner Ernst (1953). Franz von Papen and the Movement of Anschluss with Austria, 1934–1938: An Episode in German Diplomacy. Madison, Wisconsin: University of Wisconsin Press.
- Dorplaen, Andreas (1964). Hindenburg and the Weimar Republic. Princeton: Princeton University Press.
- Evans, Richard J. (2003). The Coming of the Third Reich. New York City: Penguin Books. ISBN 978-0141009759.
- Evans, Richard (2005). The Third Reich in Power. New York: Penguin Books. ISBN 978-0-14303-790-3.
- Grzebyk, Patrycja (2013). Criminal Responsibility for the Crime of Aggression. New York: Routledge.
- Guttstadt, Corry (2013). Turkey, the Jews, and the Holocaust. Cambridge University Press.
- Hagerman, Bart (1993). War Stories: The Men of The Airborne (1st ed.). Paducah, KY: Turner Publishing Company. ISBN 1563110970.
- Hale, William (2000). Turkish Foreign Policy, 1774-2000. London: Psychology Press.
- Hildebrand, Klaus (1986). The Third Reich. London & New York: Routledge.
- Jones, Larry Eugene (2005). "Franz von Papen, the German Center Party, and the Failure of Catholic Conservatism in the Weimar Republic". Central European History. 38 (2): 191–217. doi:10.1163/156916105775563670. S2CID 145606603.
- Kershaw, Ian (1998). Hitler: 1889–1936: Hubris. New York: Norton. ISBN 9780393320350.
- Koeves, Tibor (2018). Satan in Top Hat: The Biography of Franz von Papen. London: Arcole Publishing. ISBN 978-1258088286.
- Kolb, Eberhard (1988). The Weimar Republic. London: Allen & Unwin.
- Longerich, Peter (2019) [2015]. Hitler: A Life [Hitler: Biographie]. Oxford: Oxford University Press.
- McMaster, John B. (1918). The United States in the World War. Vol. 2. New York; London: D. Appleton & Company.
- Papen, Franz von (1952). Memoirs. London: André Deutsch.
- Read, Anthony (2004). The Devil's Disciples: Hitler's Inner Circle. New York: Norton. ISBN 978-039304-800-1.
- Rolfs, Richard (1995). The Sorcerer's Apprentice: The Life Of Franz von Papen. Lanham: University Press of America. ISBN 0-7618-0163-4.
- Schulze, Hagen (2001). Germany: A New History. Cambridge, Massachusetts: Harvard University Press.
- Shirer, William (1990). The Rise and Fall of the Third Reich. New York: MJF Books. ISBN 978-1-56731-163-1.
- Sudoplatov, Pavel. Special Tasks: The Memoirs of an Unwanted Witness – A Soviet Spymaster. Boston: Little, Brown and Company, 1994.
- Turner, Henry Ashby (1996). Hitler's Thirty Days to Power: January 1933. Reading, Massachusetts: Addison-Wesley. ISBN 9780201407143.
- Watt, D.C. (1989). How War Came: The Immediate Origins of the Second World War, 1938–1939. New York: Pantheon Books.
- Weinberg, Gerhard (1970). The Foreign Policy of Hitler's Germany: Diplomatic Revolution in Europe. Chicago: University of Chicago Press.
- Weinberg, Gerhard (1980). The Foreign Policy of Hitler's Germany: Starting World War II. Chicago: University of Chicago Press.
- Weinberg, Gerhard (2005). A World In Arms. Cambridge, England: Cambridge University Press.
- Wheeler-Bennett, John W. (1967). Nemesis of Power: The German Army in Politics 1918–1945. London: Macmillan Publishers.
- Wistrich, Robert S. (1982). Who's Who in Nazi Germany. Macmillan Publishers. ISBN 0-02-630600-X.

Political offices
Preceded by Heinrich Brüning	Chancellor of Germany; 1932	Succeeded by Kurt von Schleicher
Preceded by Otto Braun as Minister President	Reichskommissar of Prussia; 1932	Succeeded by Kurt von Schleicher
Preceded by Hermann Dietrich	Vice-Chancellor of Germany; 1933 – 1934	Vacant Title next held by Franz Blücher
Preceded by Kurt von Schleicher	Reichskommissar of Prussia; 1933	Succeeded by Hermann Göring as Minister President
Diplomatic posts
Preceded by Kurt Rieth	Ambassador of Germany to Austria; 1934 – 1938	Vacant Title next held by Carl-Hermann Mueller-Graaf
Preceded by Friedrich von Keller	Ambassador of Germany to Turkey; 1939 – 1944	Vacant Title next held by Wilhelm Haas
