= Potępa (surname) =

Potępa ([pɔˈtɛmpa]), alternative spelling Potempa, is a Polish surname. Notable people with the surname include:

- Annette Potempa (born 1976), German gymnast
- Wioletta Potępa (born 1980), Polish discus thrower
