= Gmina Krupski Młyn =

Gmina Krupski Młyn Krupski Młyn Commune
- Gmina
- Coat of arms
- Interactive map of Gmina Krupski Młyn
- Coordinates (Krupski Młyn): 50°34′27″N 18°37′26″E
- Country: Poland
- Voivodeship: Silesian
- County: Tarnowskie Góry
- Seat: Krupski Młyn

Area
  - Total: 39.42 km^{2} (15.22 sq mi)

Population (2019-06-30)
  - Total: 3,175
  - Density: 80.54/km^{2} (208.6/sq mi)
- Website: https://krupskimlyn.eu/

Gmina Krupski Młyn is a rural gmina (administrative district) in Tarnowskie Góry County, Silesian Voivodeship, in southern Poland. Its seat is the village of Krupski Młyn, which lies approximately 23 kilometres (14 mi) north-west of Tarnowskie Góry and 45 km (28 mi) north-west of the regional capital Katowice. It also contains the villages of Potępa and Ziętek.

The district covers an area of 39.42 square kilometres (15.2 sq mi), and as of 2019, its total population was 3,175.

The area is environmentally impressive and mostly forested (83% of the area), with many oak trees up to 500 years old and dotted with pleasant streams and small lakes.

== Neighbouring gminas ==
Gmina Krupski Młyn is bordered by the town of Lubliniec and by the gminas of Pawonków, Tworóg, Wielowieś and Zawadzkie.

== Explosives plant ==
The major industrial establishment in the area is NITRON S.A., a company specializing in production of explosives. The company has a long history since its establishment in 1874 (then in Germany). There was a notable explosion in the plant in 1918, with numerous fatalities. The reconstructed Kruppamühle der Lignose Sprengstoffwerke GmbH employed 300 in 1929 and 750 in 1944. In 1934, the production was switched over to nitroglycerin and dynamite types of explosives.

Nowadays, the plant essentially consists of a system of bunkers in a forest, with strong walls but light roofs. It produces mostly explosives for applications in mining and civil engineering.
