= Potępa =

Village in Silesia

- Village
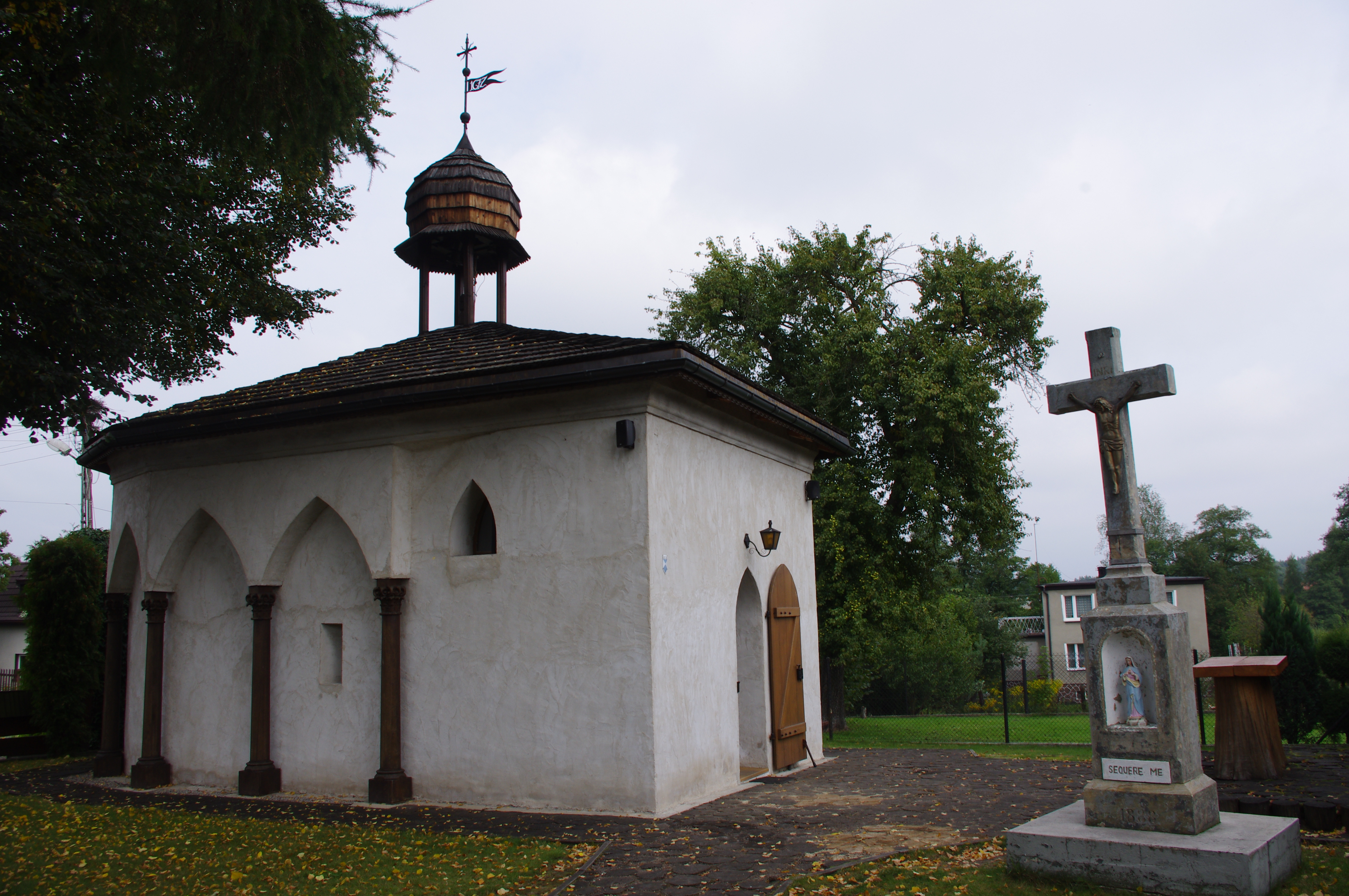
- Chapel

- Location within Poland
- Coordinates: 50°33′57″N 18°39′42″E
- Country: Poland
- Voivodeship: Silesian
- County: Tarnowskie Góry
- Gmina: Krupski Młyn
- Population (2008): 841

Potępa [pɔˈtɛmpa] is a village in the administrative district of Gmina Krupski Młyn, within Tarnowskie Góry County, Silesian Voivodeship, in southern Poland.

== Cause célèbre ==
On the night of 9 August 1932, five uniformed Nazi Stormtroopers (Sturmabteilung) burst into the apartment of miner, trade unionist, member of the Communist Party of Germany, Konrad Pietrzuch, and beat him to death in the presence of his mother and younger brother. The five murderers did nothing to disguise themselves during the attack and they were quickly arrested. After a well-publicized trial in Beuthen (now Bytom, Poland), they were found guilty of murder and sentenced to death. Later, the sentence was changed to life imprisonment. In March 1933, after Hitler assumed office, the murderers were released.
