= Krupski Młyn =

Village in Silesia

- Village
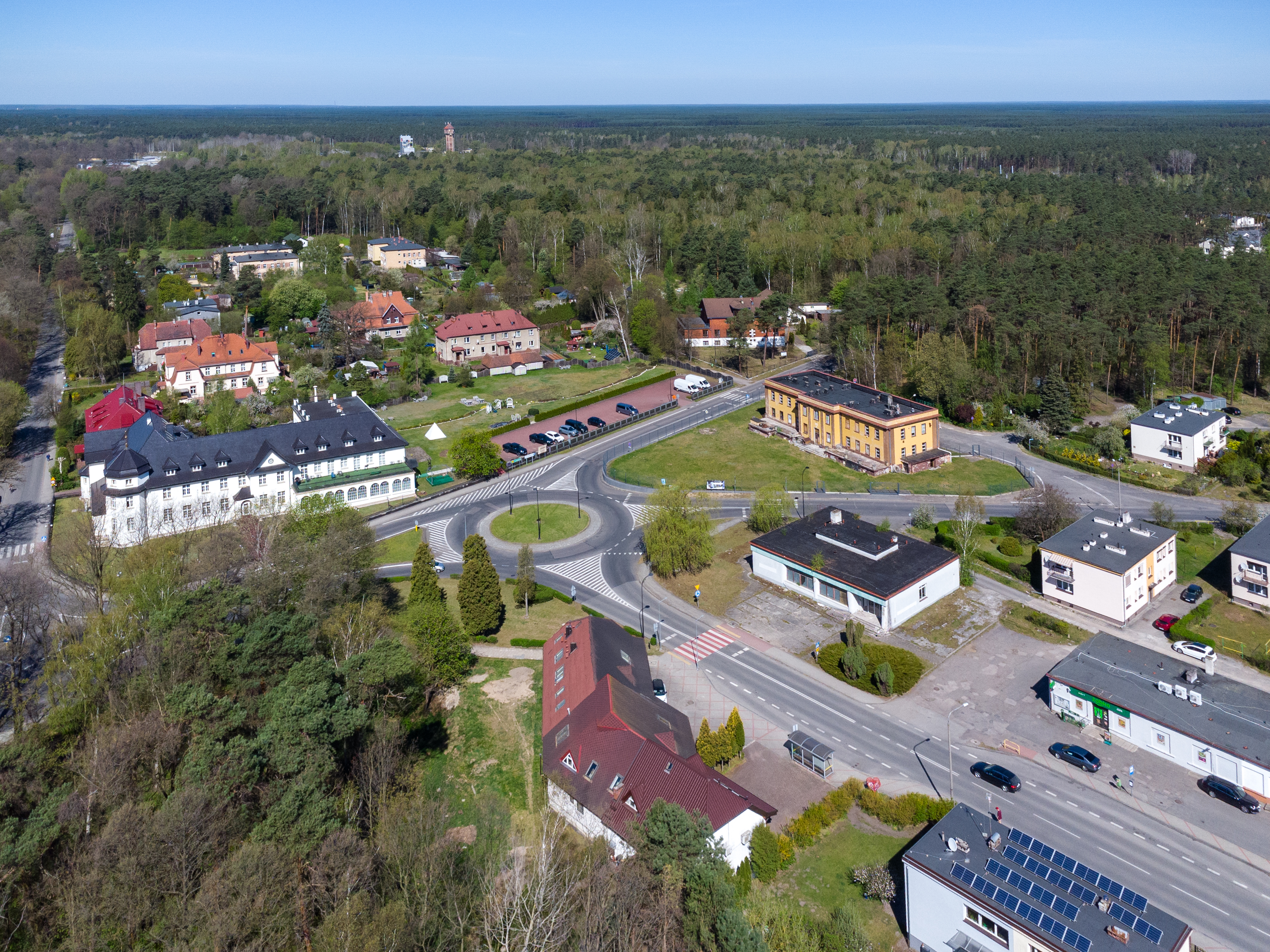

- Location within Poland
- Coordinates: 50°34′27″N 18°37′26″E
- Country: Poland
- Voivodeship: Silesian
- County: Tarnowskie Góry
- Gmina: Krupski Młyn
- Population: 2,000

Krupski Młyn [ˈkrupski ˈmwɨn] is a village in Tarnowskie Góry County, Silesian Voivodeship, in southern Poland. It is the seat of the gmina (administrative district) called Gmina Krupski Młyn.
