= Gliwicka Street in Tarnowskie Góry =

Street in Tarnowskie Góry, Poland

Gliwicka Street
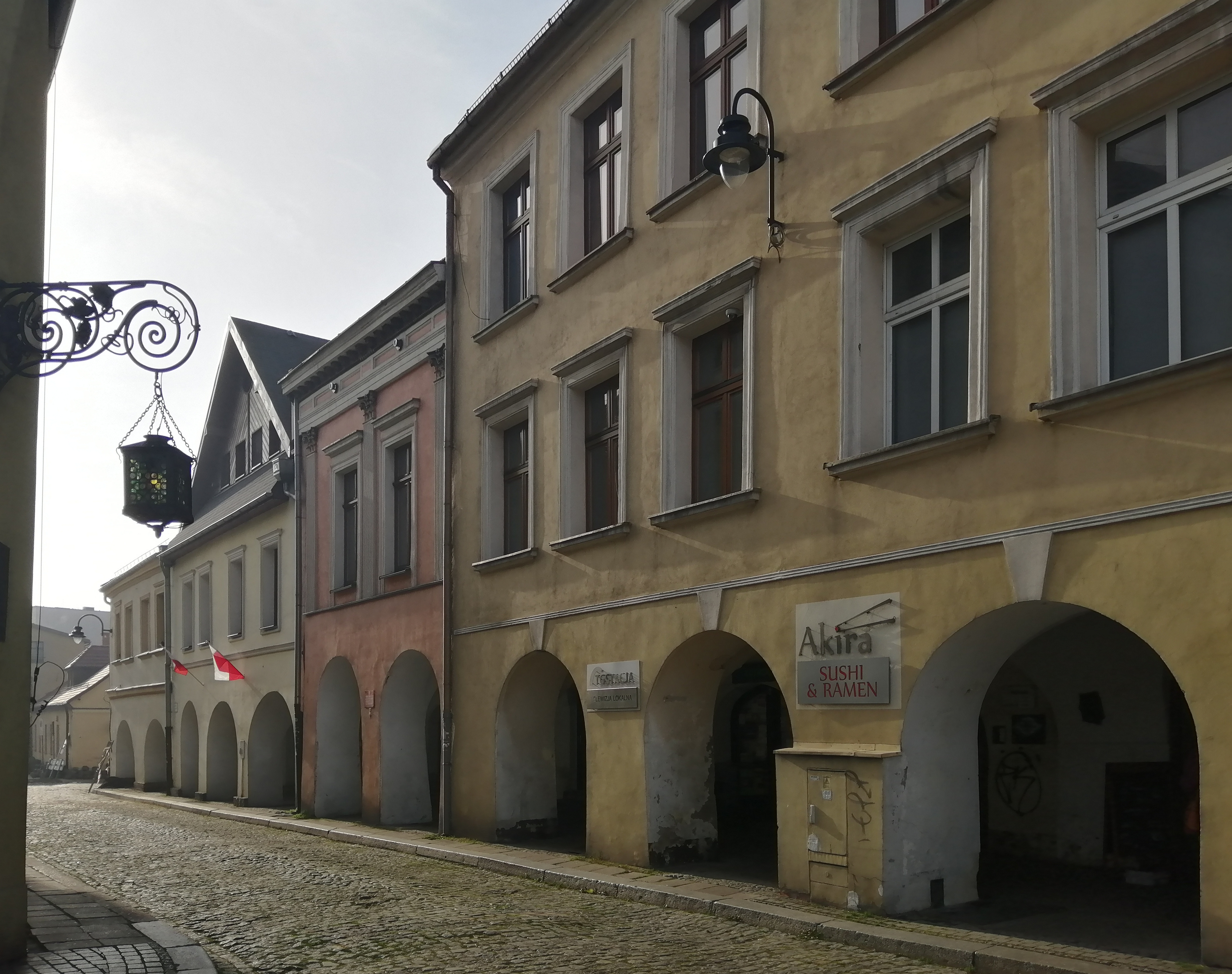
- Initial section of Gliwicka Street with arcaded houses
- Interactive map of Gliwicka Street
- Former names: Gleiwitzerstraße (until 1925 and from 1939 to 1945); Manifestu Lipcowego Street (section; until 1990)
- Part of: Śródmieście-Centrum, Repty Śląskie
- Length: 5,060 m (16,600 ft)
- Location: Tarnowskie Góry, Poland
- Coordinates: 50°25′14″N 18°49′04″E

Gliwicka Street is a main thoroughfare in Tarnowskie Góry, Poland, originating in Śródmieście-Centrum, connecting to the Repty Śląskie district, and extending to the administrative boundary with Bytom.

The street begins at the southwestern corner of the Market Square and runs through the historic core as a municipal road until its junction with Stefan Wyszyński Street and Legionów Street. Beyond this, it transitions into a county road and then a national road, heading southwest.

Established in the 16th century with the city's founding, Gliwicka Street is among Tarnowskie Góry's oldest streets. It is lined with historic buildings, many listed in the Registry of Cultural Property, including the arcaded houses, Florczak House, Gwarek House, and the churches of Saints Peter and Paul and St. Anne. Other structures are included in the municipal register of historic sites.

Bus services, managed by the Metropolitan Transport Authority, operate along the street, facilitating public transportation.

== Route ==
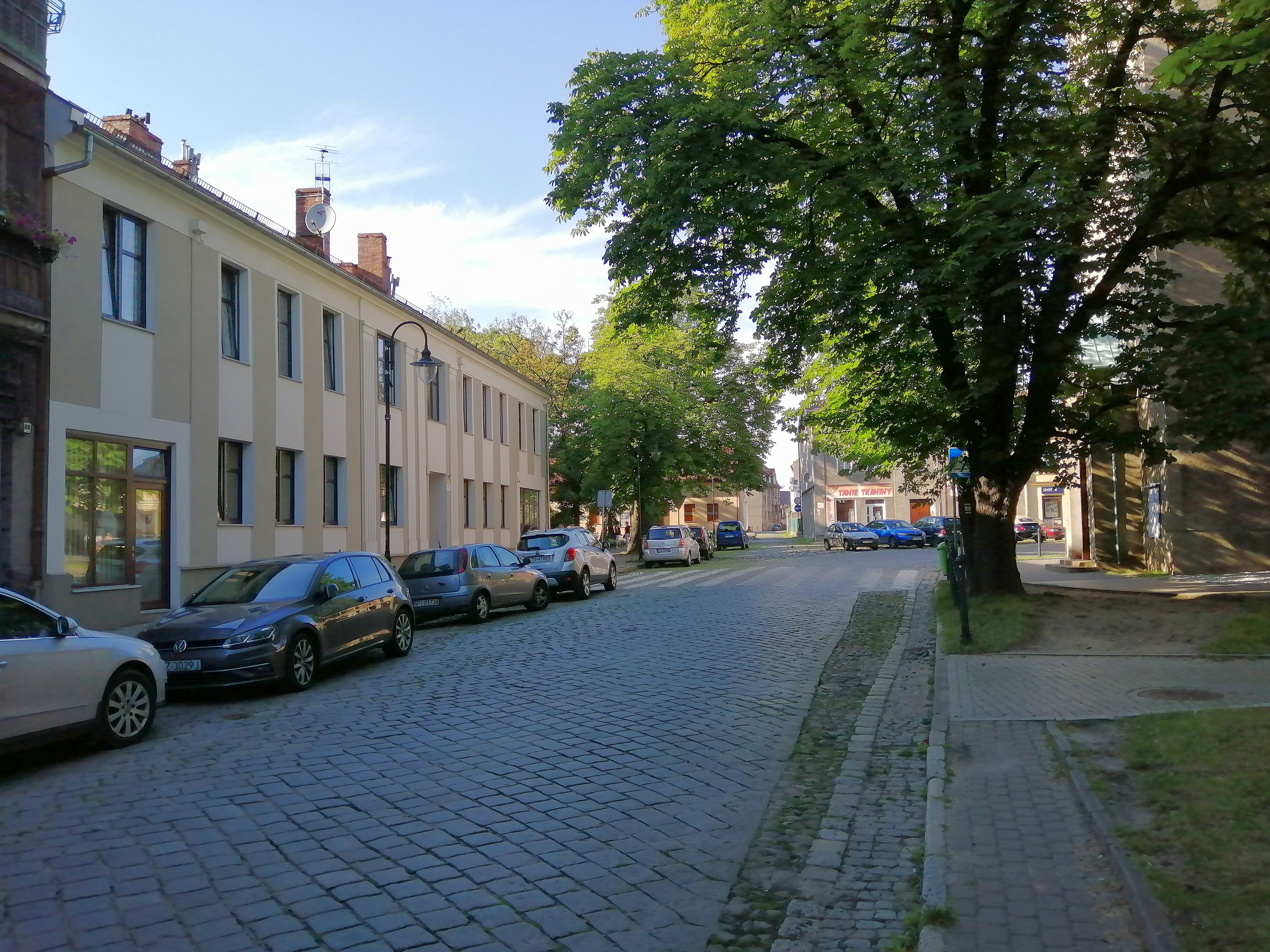
Gliwicka Street near the Church of Saints Peter and Paul

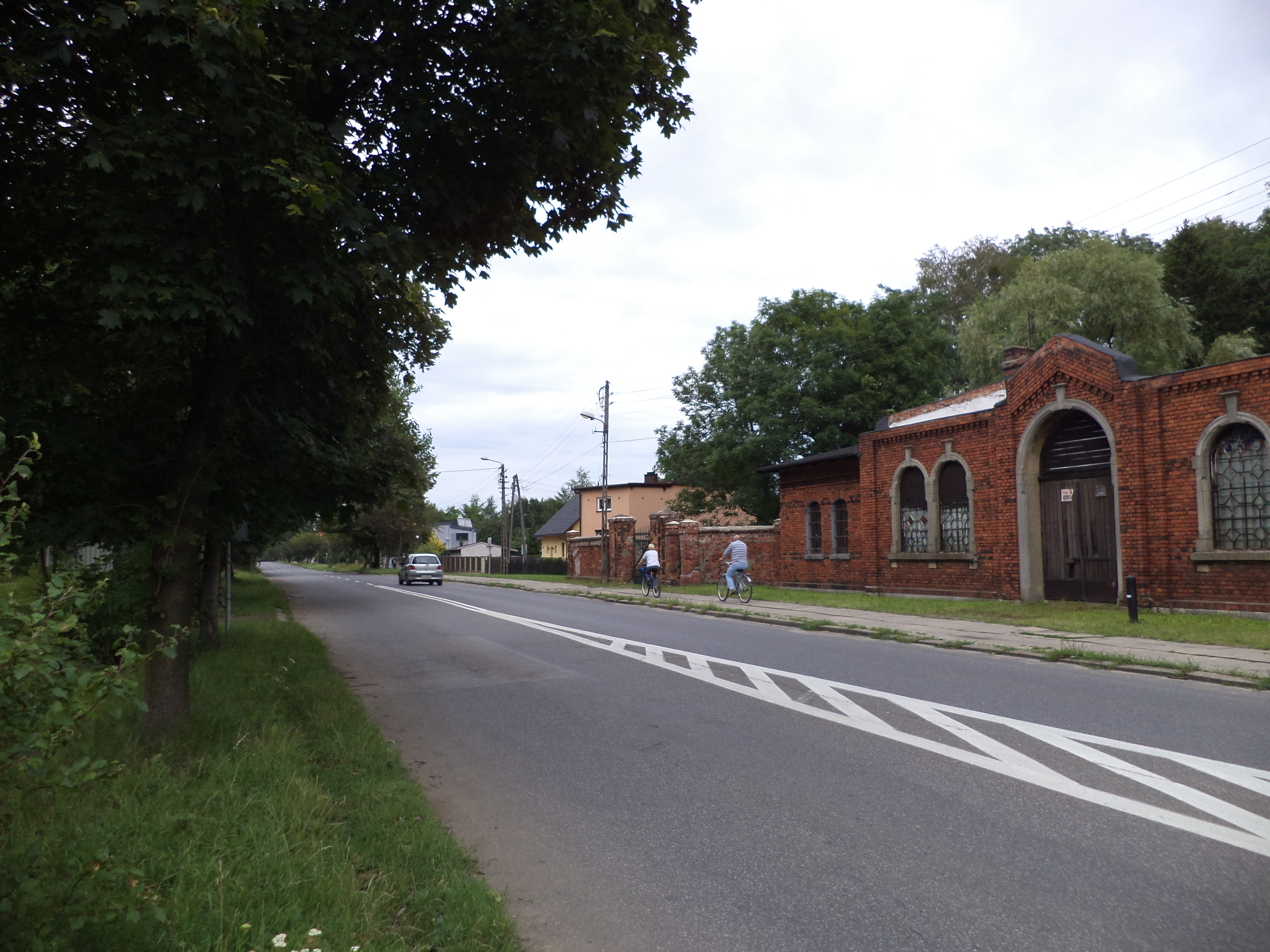
County section of Gliwicka Street near the Jewish cemetery (pre-funeral house visible on the right)

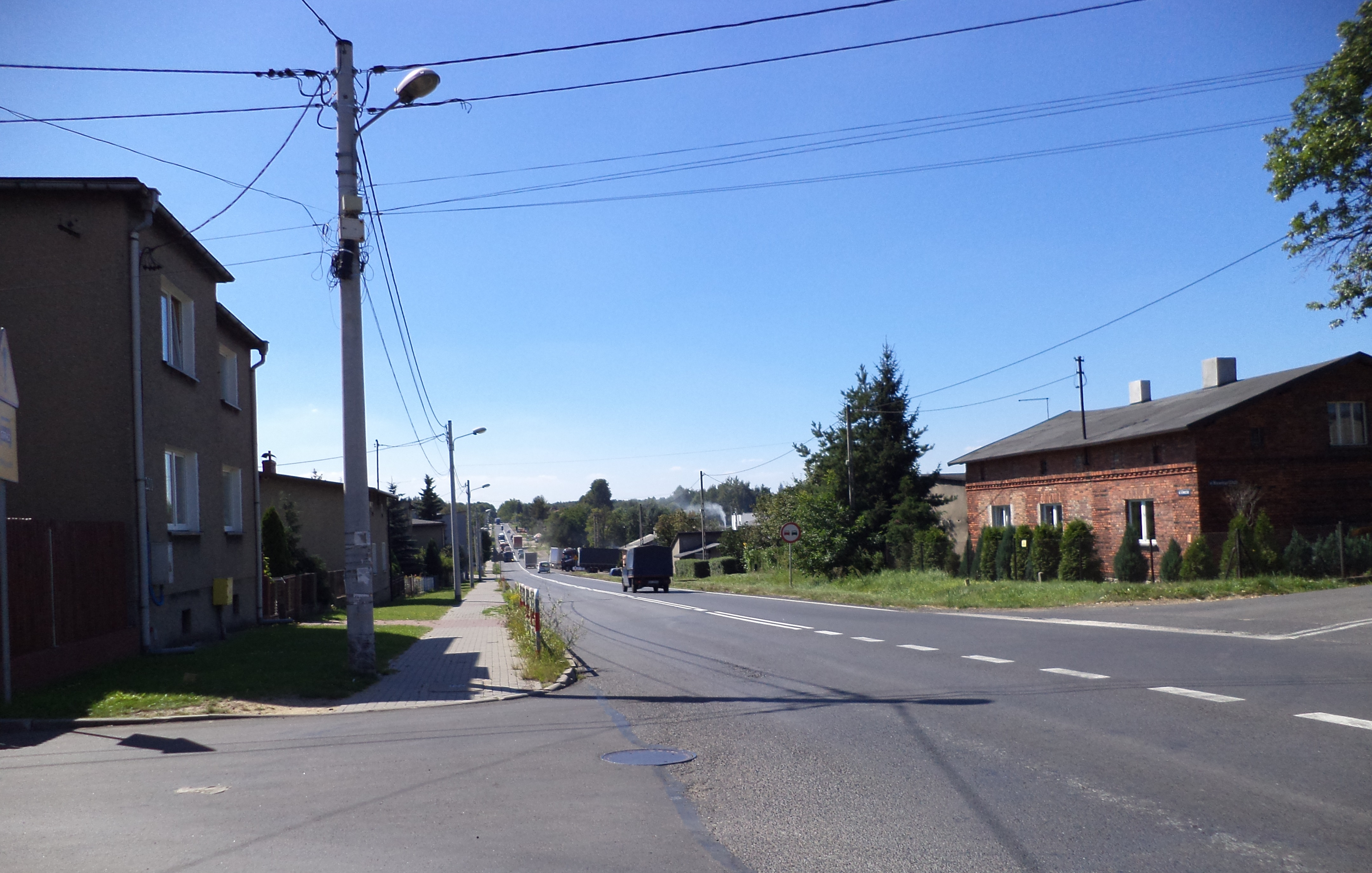
Gliwicka Street as part of National Road No. 78 in Repty Śląskie

Gliwicka Street begins in Śródmieście-Centrum at the southwestern corner of the Market Square. It heads south for 40 meters, turns west, and after 60 meters, at the intersection with Dolna and Ratuszowa streets, resumes a southern course. Crossing Gwarków Square and Teofil Królik Street, it reaches the Solidarity Roundabout, opened in 2010, where it meets Legionów Street and Stefan Wyszyński Street. This section is a municipal road (Class Z, No. 270 049 S).

Over the next 814 meters, it operates as a county road (Class G, No. 3274 S), maintaining a southwest direction. It passes the Church of St. Anne, its cemetery, and the Jewish cemetery. After crossing Obwodnica Street, it joins National Road No. 78, a single carriageway road (Class GP) between Gliwice and Tarnowskie Góry. The street runs by the former unemployed workers' colony at Szczęść Boże Street and the Staszic Colony, then proceeds through Nowe Repty in the Repty Śląskie district. It intersects Wincenty Witos Street (county road No. 3221 S, connecting to Ptakowice) and Stefan Żeromski Street (county road No. 3305 S). The street ends at the city's boundary, continuing as Żołnierska Street in Bytom's Górniki district.

The street's initial winding path results from 16th-century mining activities, where new ore deposits found during construction led to the relocation of buildings and streets to accommodate mine shafts.

== Name ==
Since the 16th century, the road linking Tarnowskie Góry to Gliwice was known as Gliwicka Street or Gliwice Road. It was officially named Gleiwitzerstraße in the late 19th century when the city formalized street names.

On 25 May 1925, following Tarnowskie Góry's incorporation into the Second Polish Republic, the street was renamed Gliwicka Street as part of a campaign to adopt Polish names. During World War II, it reverted to Gleiwitzerstraße.

Until 1990, a segment in Repty Śląskie was called Manifestu Lipcowego Street, after the Manifesto of the Polish Committee of National Liberation.

== History ==
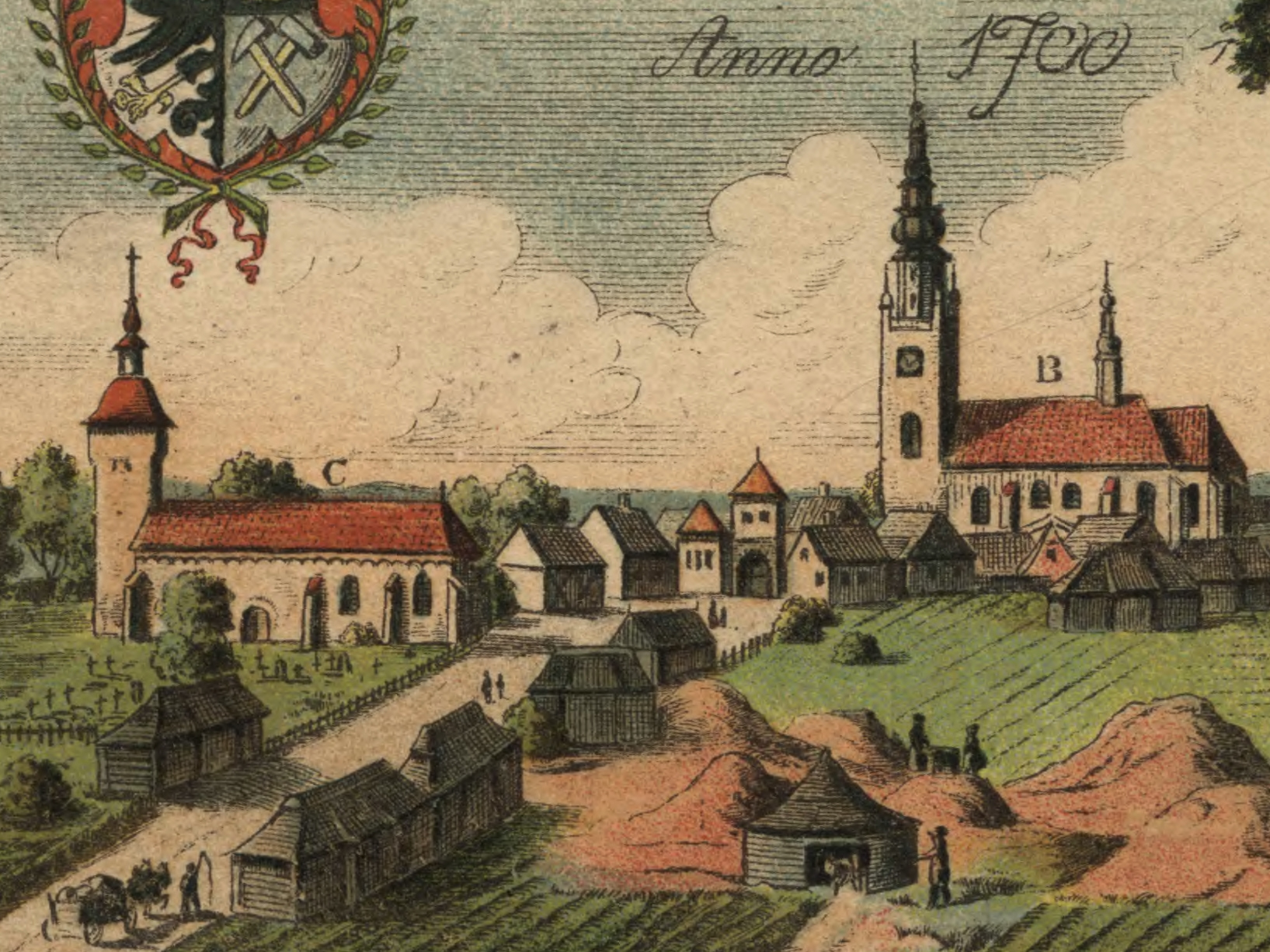
1900 postcard by Paul Knötel, depicting Tarnowskie Góry circa 1700, showing (left to right): Saint Anne's cemetery and church, the Gliwice Gate, the road (now Gliwicka Street), and the Church of Saints Peter and Paul

Gliwicka Street, one of Tarnowskie Góry's oldest streets, was established in 1526 with the city's founding. It extended from the original market square (now Gwarków Square) southwest toward the Gliwice Gate, also known as the Wrocław Gate. This was one of three city gates used for fiscal purposes, alongside the Kraków Gate at Krakowska Street and the Lubliniec Gate at the junction of Opolska Street and John III Sobieski Street.

Between 1523 and 1525, a small Catholic chapel was likely built on a plot between the square and Gliwicka Street. In 1529, Lutherans erected a wooden church on its foundations, with a cemetery opposite and a rectory nearby. After a 1531 city fire, the wooden church was replaced with a stone structure, now the Church of Saints Peter and Paul, expanded in 1545 (chancel) and between 1560 and 1563 (tower, largely preserved). Due to overcrowding, epidemic risks, and construction needs, a new cemetery was established in 1559 west of Gliwicka Street, outside the city walls.

After 1531, the street extended 200 meters north to house the Florczak House (6 Gliwicka Street), the city's first stone building and mining office. It was later extended 150 meters northeast, forming the current Market Square. In the late 16th century, grand arcaded houses were built along the Market Square's western side and Gliwicka Street (1, 3, 5 Gliwicka Street; 17, 18 Rynek Street). In 1598, the Gwarek House (2 Gliwicka Street) was constructed. Per Dr. Danuta Szlachcic-Dudzicz's analysis of 1570–1580 property records, Gliwicka Street had 25 houses: three owned by very wealthy burghers, four by wealthy burghers, seven by moderately wealthy burghers, and one by the city.

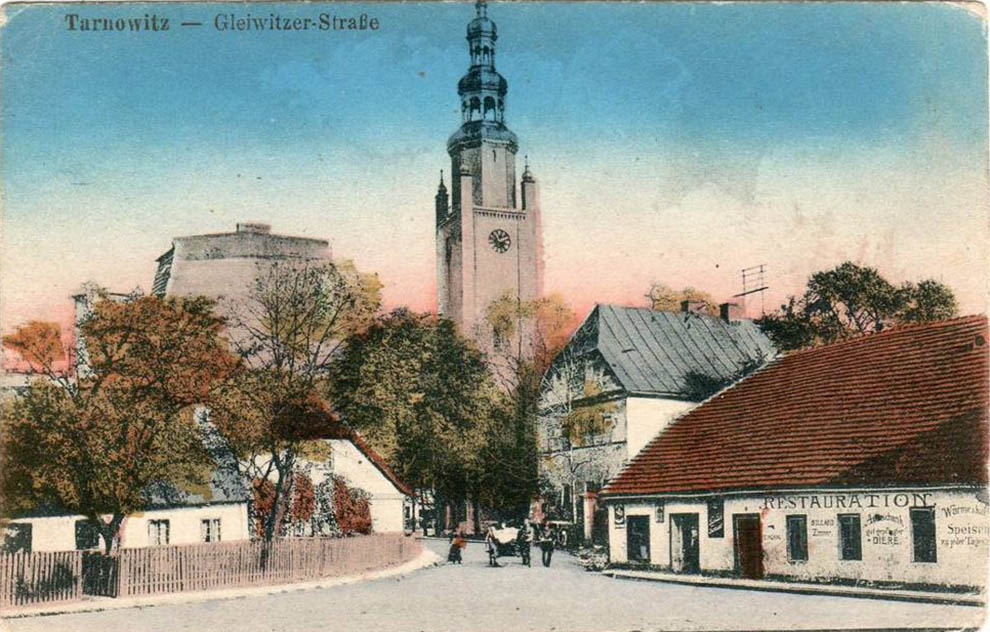
Gliwicka Street with the Church of Saints Peter and Paul, circa 1920 postcard

The growing Protestant population led to the construction of a second church between 1617 and 1619 on the new cemetery, funded by Mayor Jakub Gruzełka and burgher Goske as the Saint James funeral church (later Church of St. Anne). A sacristy was added in 1707, with further renovations between 1846 and 1847 and in 1928.

A hospital operated from 1538 near the Gliwice Gate until the 1860s. After 1907, it was demolished, and the Piestrak Villa (24 Gliwicka Street) was built in its place.

In 1629 (officially, though actually in 1634 for the parish church and 1653 for the cemetery church), both churches were transferred to Catholic control. Between 1723 and 1724, a Saint Barbara chapel was added to the parish church, completed in 1730. In 1798, a new tented roof was added to the tower, with major renovations between 1848 and 1851. A new rectory (14 Gliwicka Street) was built in 1873, and a vicarage (16 Gliwicka Street) in 1818.

A 1736 map of the Duchy of Opole by Iohannes Wolfgang Wieland shows the road to Gliwice, including Gliwicka Street. The earliest surviving plan of Tarnowskie Góry's center, including Gliwicka Street, dates to 1797, detailing a water supply system from a 40-inch steam engine at the Reden shaft (near present-day Skośna Street) along Gliwicka Street to a reservoir in the Market Square, operational from 19 October 1797 for 11 years.

In 1754, the Gwarek House (2 Gliwicka Street) became an Evangelical school, operating until 1854. In 1856, it was acquired by Joseph Lukaschik and integrated into his 1845 soap factory complex. A Catholic school operated at 18 Gliwicka Street, near the Church of Saints Peter and Paul.

In 1818, the street was paved with cobblestones. In 1832, the Gliwice Gate at the junction of Gliwicka and Wyszyński streets was demolished, leaving a tollhouse for toll collection. Between 1837 and 1838, the Gliwice road, including Gliwicka Street, was rebuilt and paved. In 1837, a printing house was established at the Gliwicka and Ratuszowa streets intersection (Robert Reimann Buchdruckerei, later Charlotte Reimann Buchdruckerei), publishing the Tarnowitzer Wochenblatt until World War I.

In 1822, a Jewish cemetery was established east of the Gliwice road, expanded in 1859, with a pre-funeral house built in 1874 and enlarged in 1894.

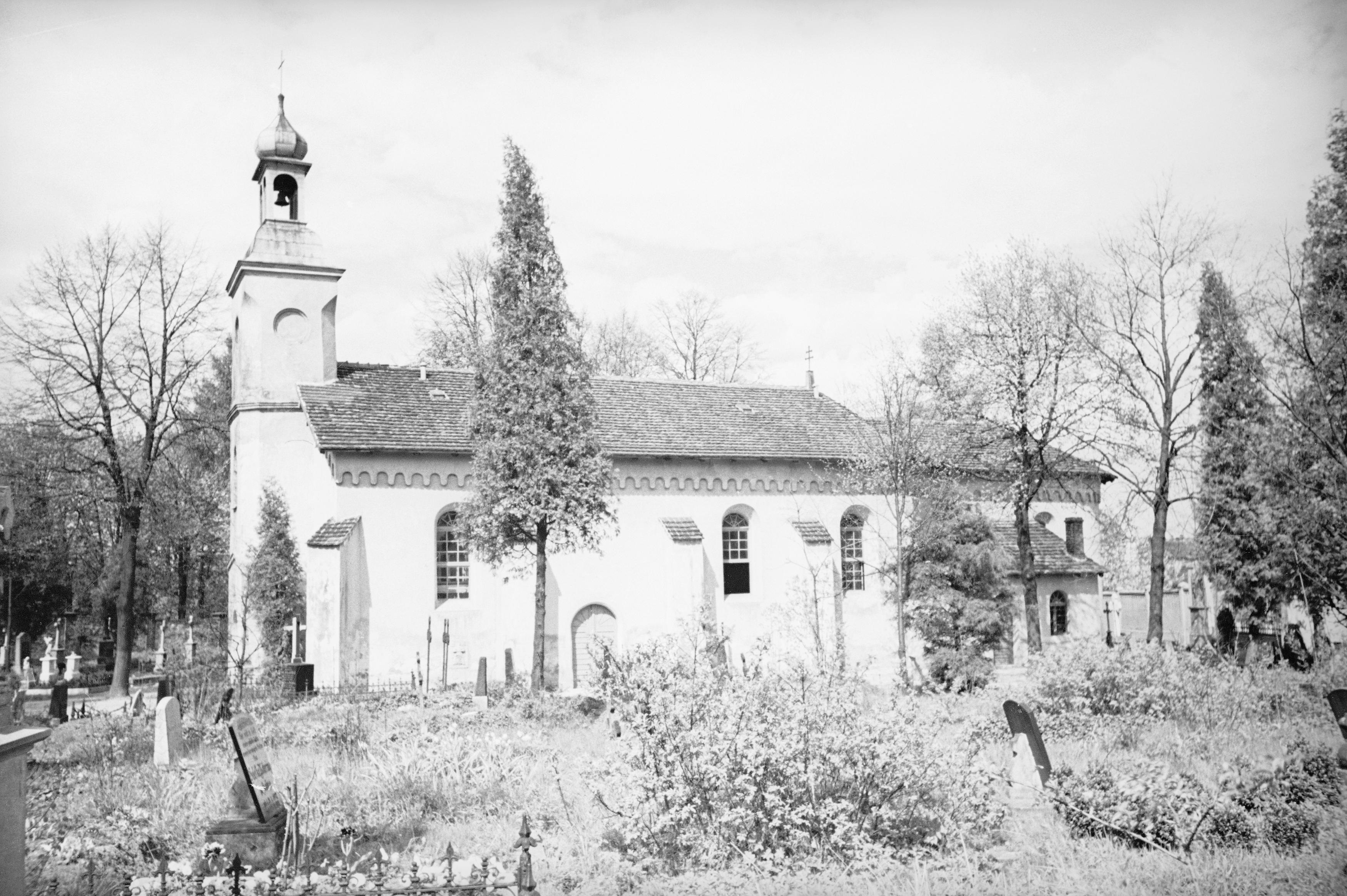
Church of St. Anne in 1937

From 1857 to 1892, a mining school operated at 25 Gliwicka Street, previously at the Cochler House at the Market Square, and from 1870 to 1874, it housed a secondary school led by naturalist Dr. Paul Wossidlo. In 1870, the Sisters of Mercy of St. Borromeo from Trzebnica arrived, acquiring a house at 22 Gliwicka Street in 1878 from miner Edward Capell, converting it into the St. Joseph Institute (now a social care home).

In the 19th century, the Planeta calamine mine operated between Repty Śląskie and Stolarzowice, featured on the Carnall Service.

After World War I and Tarnowskie Góry's integration into Poland in 1922, the Church of St. Anne became a garrison church (or, per some sources, an auxiliary chapel under the Lubliniec garrison parish). In 1932, its cemetery was reorganized, with graves and paths rearranged and the Ehr family's baroque chapel demolished. In 1938, the city planned a 10.5-hectare Jordan Park on post-mining land east of Gliwicka Street, but construction, interrupted by World War II, was completed in 1945 as a youth cultural center.

From 1952 to 1996, the arcaded house at 5 Gliwicka Street housed the Tarnowskie Góry State Archive, under the Katowice Provincial Archive.

In January 2018, as part of the "Silver Route" project, the municipal section of Gliwicka Street received new LED lighting, replacing sodium lamps, symbolizing the city's silver mining heritage.

== Monuments ==
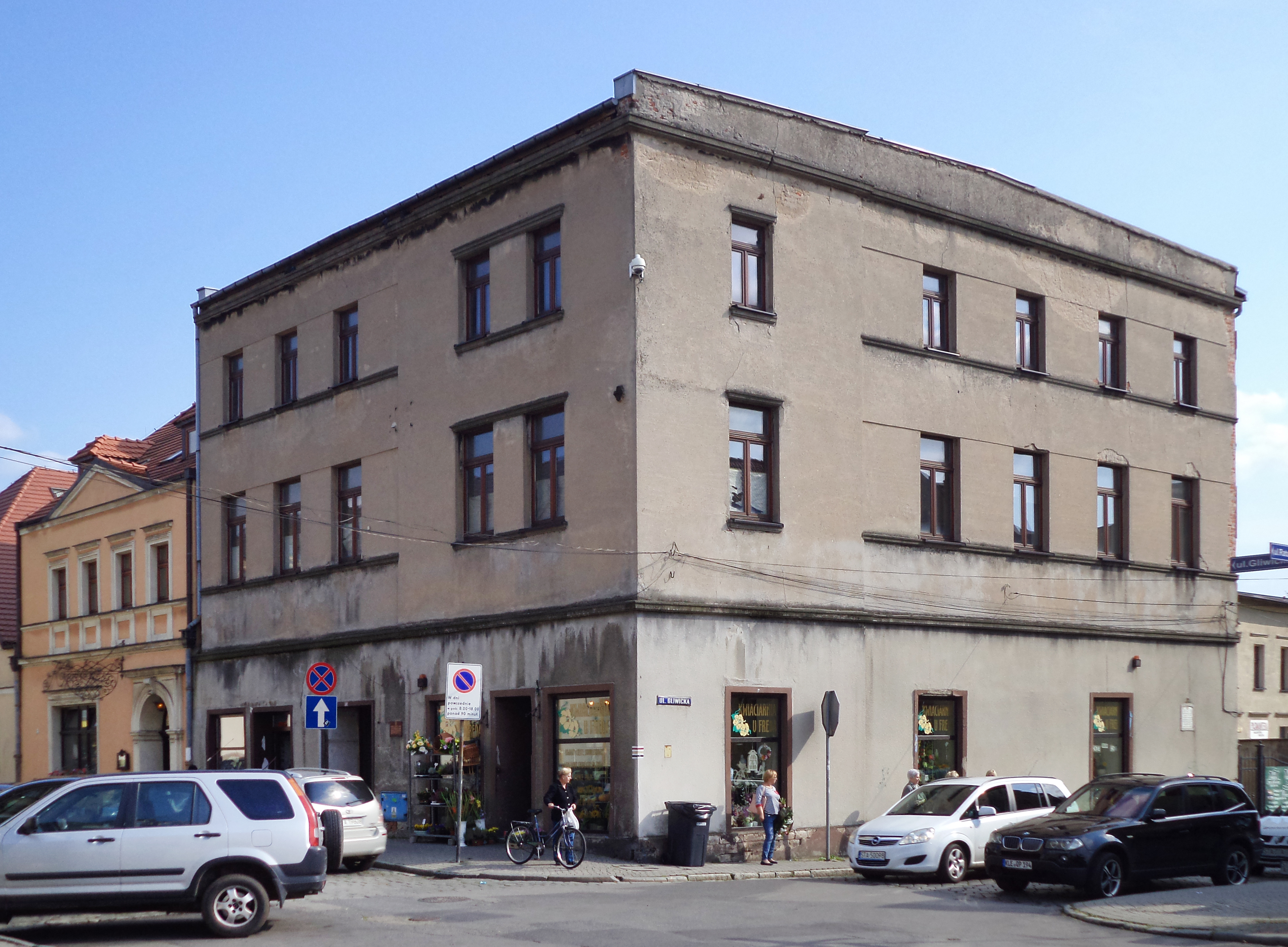
Florczak House at 6 Gliwicka Street

The oldest monuments along Gliwicka Street date to the 16th century, built near mining shafts. Despite partial renovations, these buildings retain original walls, vaulted rooms, and basements. The houses at 1, 3, and 5 Gliwicka Street form part of the arcaded houses. The basement of 3 Gliwicka Street preserves jambs with the builder's house mark. The corner house at 5 Gliwicka Street, renovated in the 19th century, features a neoclassical southern facade with a triangular gable, a circular medallion depicting children playing, and niches with statues of Hebe and Demeter or Persephone.

Opposite, the houses at 2 (Gwarek House) and 4 (Kopacki House) Gliwicka Street were saved from post-World War II demolition by the Association of Lovers of the Tarnowskie Góry Land, which uses them as its headquarters. In 2021, 4 Gliwicka Street became the Młotek i Perlik hostel, named after soap produced by Joseph Lukaschik's factory.

The corner house at 6 Gliwicka Street, Florczak House, is traditionally linked to the 1490 or 1519 discovery of silver-bearing ore by Peasant Rybka. Though altered by renovations, it retains some basements and a lobby with a 1664 ceiling with rose windows, likely from a renovation.

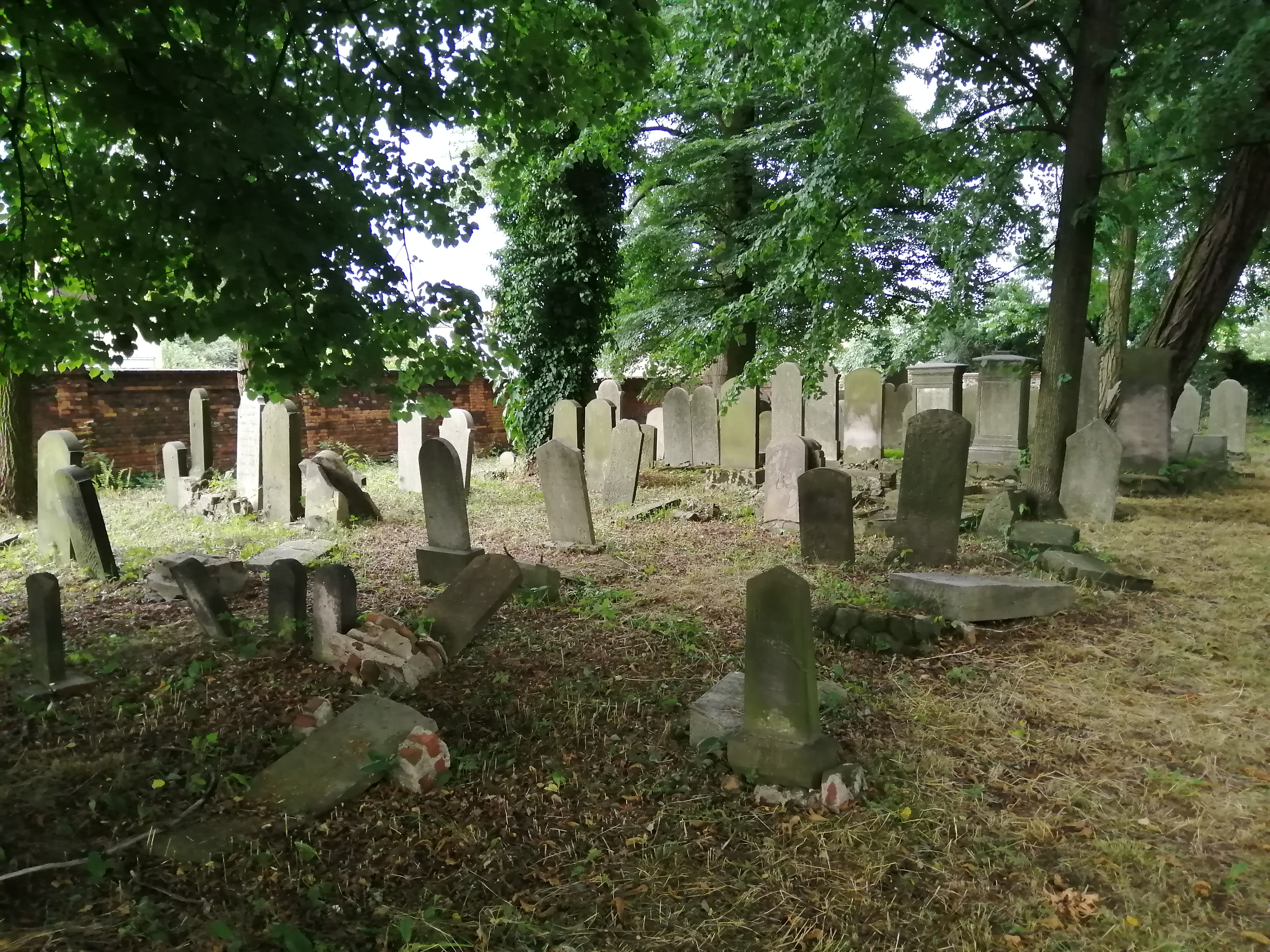
Jewish cemetery at 66 Gliwicka Street

These buildings were added to the Registry of Cultural Property on 15 April 1966: 1 Gliwicka Street (No. 616/66), 2 Gliwicka Street (No. 617/66), 3 Gliwicka Street (No. 618/66), 4 Gliwicka Street (No. 619/66), 5 Gliwicka Street (No. 620/66), and 6 Gliwicka Street (No. 621/66). Sacred monuments include the Church of Saints Peter and Paul (No. 611/66, 15 April 1966), Church of St. Anne (No. 622/66, 27 April 1966), and the Jewish cemetery with its pre-funeral house and fence (No. A/742/2021, 7 January 2021). The street's initial section, from the Rynek to the Solidarity Roundabout, lies within the historic urban layout of Tarnowskie Góry's center, registered on 27 April 1966 (No. 610/66), with preserved 19th-century cobblestone and granite paving.

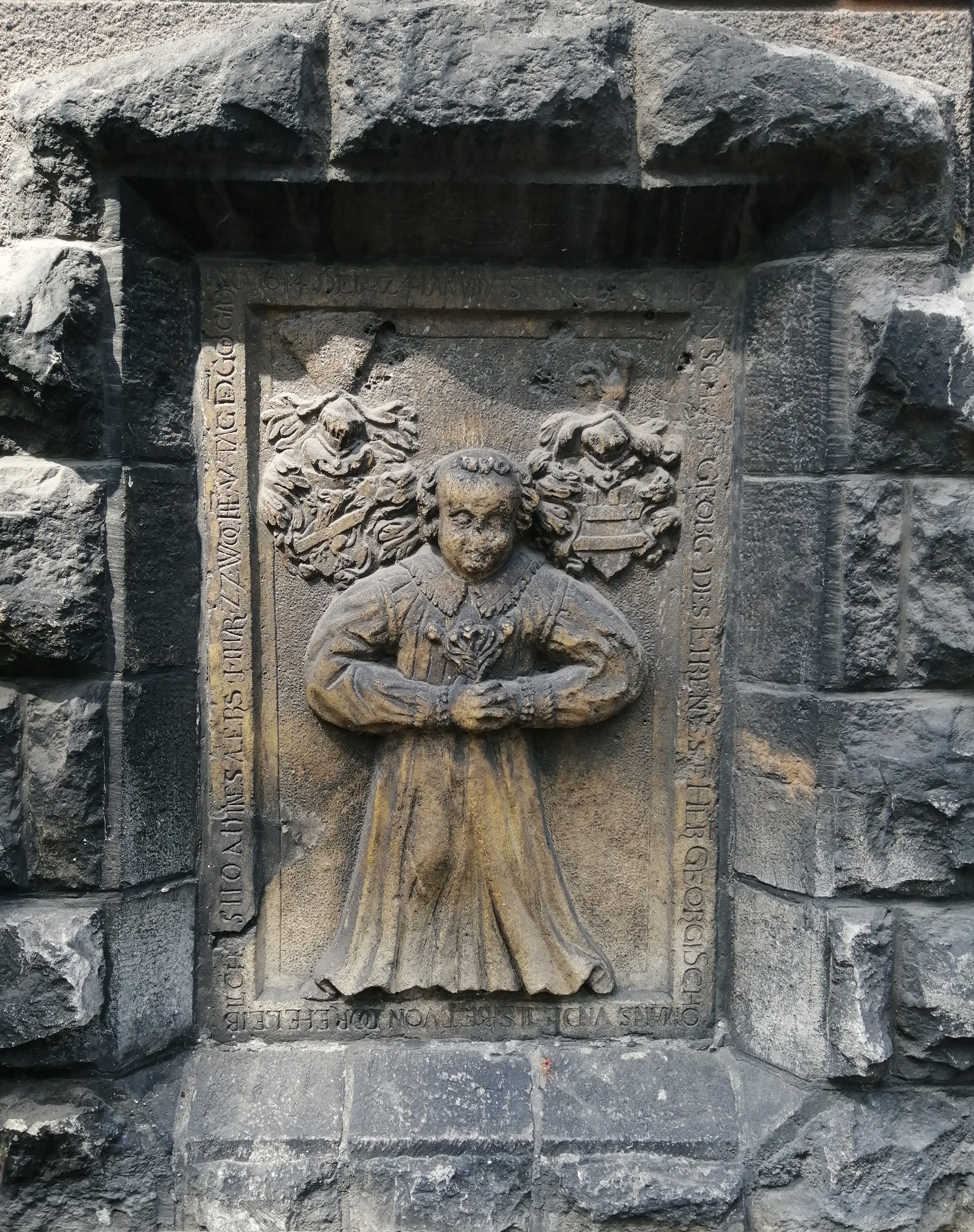
1614 tombstone of Georg Schomann, embedded in the facade of 27 Gliwicka Street

The municipal register of historic sites includes other houses in the city center, such as 7, 8, 10, 13, 17, 19, 21, 27, and 33 Gliwicka Street, built from the 17th century (e.g., 7 Gliwicka Street) to the early 20th century (e.g., 1924 house of chronicler Jan Nowak at 13 Gliwicka Street). The 1914 house at 27 Gliwicka Street features a Renaissance tombstone of Georg Schomann (died 1614), depicting a child in a long dress holding flowers, likely unearthed during church renovations and reused in the building's foundations.

Near the Church of Saints Peter and Paul, the municipal register lists:

- a wooden cross in the church wall,
- a mission cross,
- a 19th-century stone cross on a pedestal,
- the 1873 rectory (14 Gliwicka Street),
- an early 20th-century statue on a pedestal,
- the 1818 vicarage (16 Gliwicka Street),
- a former parish school (18 Gliwicka Street).

Near the Church of St. Anne, it includes a 1985 mission cross and the surrounding cemetery.

Other municipal register entries include:

- the Sisters of Borromeo care home (former almshouse) at 22 Gliwicka Street,
- the former mining school at 25 Gliwicka Street,
- the early 20th-century Piestrak Villa (24 Gliwicka Street) and a 1925 villa (32 Gliwicka Street),
- early 20th-century residences in Repty Śląskie at 228, 229, 234, 244, 255, and 257 Gliwicka Street,
- a 1939 field bunker, part of the Tarnowskie Góry position, located in a wooded area behind St. Anne's cemetery.
- Wayside crosses:
  - an early 19th-century stone cross at 57 Gliwicka Street,
  - a 1807 Napoleonic cross at Gliwicka and Jaworowa streets,
  - an 1871 cross at Gliwicka and Długa streets,
  - a monument with a carved cross commemorating a 24 April 1909 car accident that killed Count Gustaw Ballestrem at 252 Gliwicka Street in Nowe Repty,
  - a post-1921 Silesian Uprisings memorial cross at Gliwicka and Niemcewicz streets,
  - a circa 1950 cross at Gliwicka and Żeromski streets.

At the Gliwicka and Kamienna streets intersection lies the Glückhilf-Schacht shaft heap of the Black Trout Adit, a 67-meter-deep shaft, one of 28 objects in the UNESCO World Heritage Site "Lead, Silver, and Zinc Mine with Underground Water Management System in Tarnowskie Góry". The adit branches into two tunnels under Gliwicka Street.

== Population ==
As of 31 December 2022, 579 people were registered as permanent residents along Gliwicka Street, per the Civil Registry Office.

== Bibliography ==
- Broniec, Marian; Bednarczyk, Ryszard; Czech, Arkadiusz; Filak, Mieczysław (2009). Przewodnik Tarnowskie Góry [Tarnowskie Góry Guide] (in Polish). Tarnowskie Góry: Drukpol. ISBN 978-83-61458-36-4.
- Gwóźdź, Krzysztof (2000). "Tarnowskie Góry w okresie habsburskim (1526-1763). Sytuacja religijna" [Tarnowskie Góry in the Habsburg Period (1526–1763). Religious Situation]. In Drabina, Jan (ed.). Historia Tarnowskich Gór [History of Tarnowskie Góry] (in Polish). Tarnowskie Góry: Muzeum w Tarnowskich Górach. ISBN 83-911508-3-6.
- Hadaś, Tadeusz B. (2000). "Przyroda i jej przemiany w dziejach Tarnowskich Gór" [Nature and Its Transformations in the History of Tarnowskie Góry]. In Drabina, Jan (ed.). Historia Tarnowskich Gór [History of Tarnowskie Góry] (in Polish). Tarnowskie Góry: Muzeum w Tarnowskich Górach. ISBN 83-911508-3-6.
- Krzykowska, Zofia (2000). "Tarnowskie Góry w okresie habsburskim (1526-1763). Najstarsze zabytki sztuki i architektury" [Tarnowskie Góry in the Habsburg Period (1526–1763). Oldest Monuments of Art and Architecture]. In Drabina, Jan (ed.). Historia Tarnowskich Gór [History of Tarnowskie Góry] (in Polish). Tarnowskie Góry: Muzeum w Tarnowskich Górach. ISBN 83-911508-3-6.
- Krzykowska, Zofia (2000). "Miasto pod panowaniem pruskim i w obrębie II Rzeszy Niemieckiej (1763–1918). Zabytki sztuki i architektury" [City under Prussian Rule and within the Second German Reich (1763–1918). Monuments of Art and Architecture]. In Drabina, Jan (ed.). Historia Tarnowskich Gór [History of Tarnowskie Góry] (in Polish). Tarnowskie Góry: Muzeum w Tarnowskich Górach. ISBN 83-911508-3-6.
- Krzykowska, Zofia (2000). "Tarnowskie Góry w okresie międzywojennym (1918–1939). Architektura" [Tarnowskie Góry in the Interwar Period (1918–1939). Architecture]. In Drabina, Jan (ed.). Historia Tarnowskich Gór [HIstory of Tarnowskie Góry] (in Polish). Tarnowskie Góry: Muzeum w Tarnowskich Górach. ISBN 83-911508-3-6.
- Krzykowska, Zofia (2000). "Lata II wojny światowej i powojennego półwiecza. Substancja zabytkowa miasta, jej stan i zagrożenia" [World War II Years and the Postwar Half-Century. The City's Historic Fabric, Its Condition, And Threats]. In Drabina, Jan (ed.). Historia Tarnowskich Gór [History of Tarnowskie Góry] (in Polish). Tarnowskie Góry: Muzeum w Tarnowskich Górach. ISBN 83-911508-3-6.
- Nadolski, Przemysław (2000). "Miasto pod panowaniem pruskim i w obrębie II Rzeszy Niemieckiej (1763–1918). Miasto i jego zabudowa" [City Under Prussian rule and within the Second German Reich (1763–1918). The City and Its Buildings]. In Drabina, Jan (ed.). Historia Tarnowskich Gór [History of Tarnowskie Góry] (in Polish). Tarnowskie Góry: Muzeum w Tarnowskich Górach. ISBN 83-911508-3-6.
- Nowak, Jan (1927). Kronika Miasta i Powiatu Tarnowskie Góry: najstarsze dzieje Śląska i ziemi Bytomsko-Tarnogórskiej: dzieje pierwszego górnictwa w Polsce [Chronicle of the City and County of Tarnowskie Góry: The Oldest History of Silesia and the Bytom-Tarnowskie Góry Region: The History of Early Mining in Poland] (in Polish). 347450 II. Tarnowskie Góry: Księgarnia Polska Jana Nowaka.
