= Stefan Wyszyński Street =

Street in Tarnowskie Góry, Poland

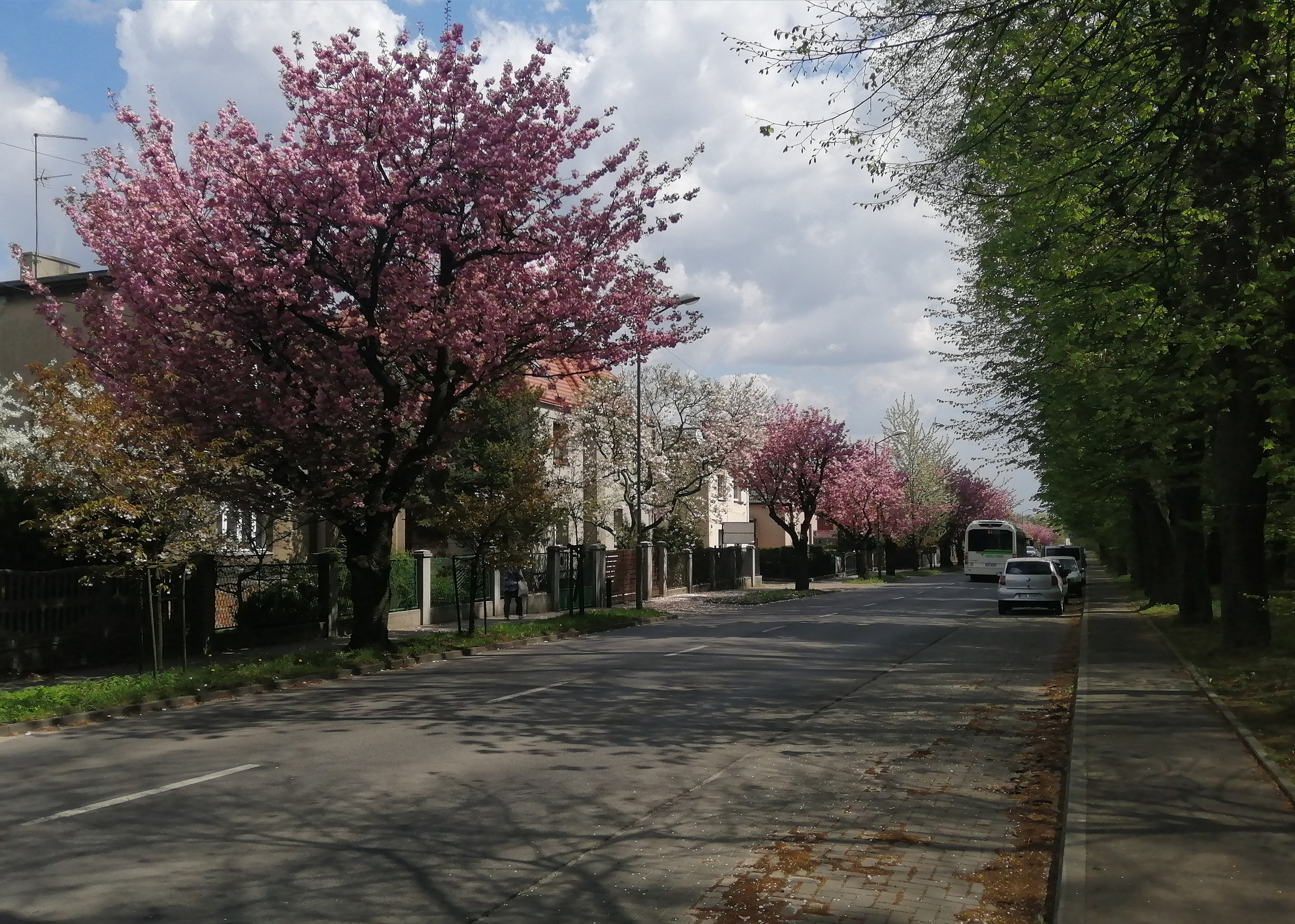
- Section of Wyszyński Street running along City Park, looking east (2020)
- Interactive map of Stefan Wyszyński Street
- Part of: Śródmieście-Centrum, Stare Tarnowice
- Length: 2,400 m (7,900 ft)
- Location: Tarnowskie Góry, Poland
- Coordinates: 50.442445°N 18.833596°E

Stefan Wyszyński Street is one of the main streets in Tarnowskie Góry. It connects Śródmieście-Centrum with the Stare Tarnowice district and forms part of county road of the main class no. 3275S of Tarnowskie Góry County.

== Route ==
The street begins in Śródmieście-Centrum at the Solidarity Roundabout, which opened in 2010. It then runs for approximately 1,100 meters along the City Park (on its northern side), after which it crosses the city bypass, which is part of national road 11 and forms the boundary between the districts of Śródmieście-Centrum and Stare Tarnowice. Further on, Wyszyński Street passes through the area of the former Freedom Colony and goes past Osiedle Przyjaźń. It ends at the intersection with Mieczysław Niedziałkowski Street near the new Church of St. Martin.

== Name ==
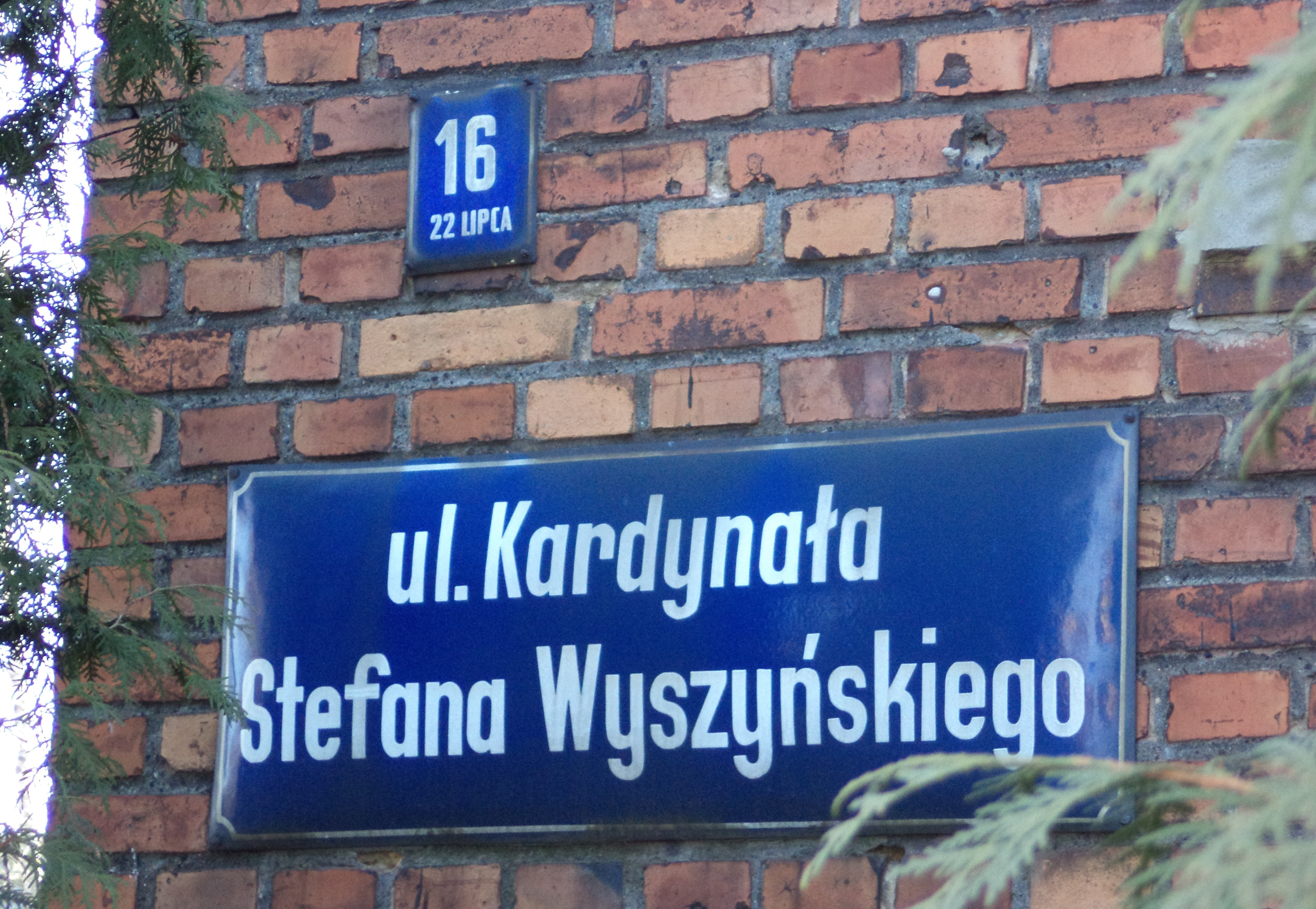
Signs displaying the current and former street names (2019)

The road leading from Tarnowskie Góry to the village of Stare Tarnowice has been known as the "Stare Tarnowice Road" or "Stare Tarnowice Highway" since the town's founding. It received the official name Alttarnowitzer Chaussee (or Alt-Tarnowitzer-Chaussee) in the second half of the 19th century, when all streets in the city were officially named.

On 25 May 1925 – three years after Tarnowskie Góry was incorporated into the Second Polish Republic – as part of a campaign to change German street and square names to Polish ones, the street was named "Starotarnowicka Street". This name remained in use until 1936, when, to honorf Michał Grażyński – an independence and social activist and long-time Silesian voivode with political ties to the Sanation movement – it was renamed "Michał Grażyński Street".

During World War II, the street was named Peiskretschamerstraße, referring to the town of Pyskowice, toward which it also led. After the war, the name from between 1925 and 1936 was briefly restored, but soon – to commemorate the Manifesto of the Polish Committee of National Liberation proclaimed in 1944 – the name was changed to "22 Lipca Street". In 1990, as part of the decommunization of street names in the city, the Town Council gave the street its current name, "Stefan Wyszyński Street".

== History ==
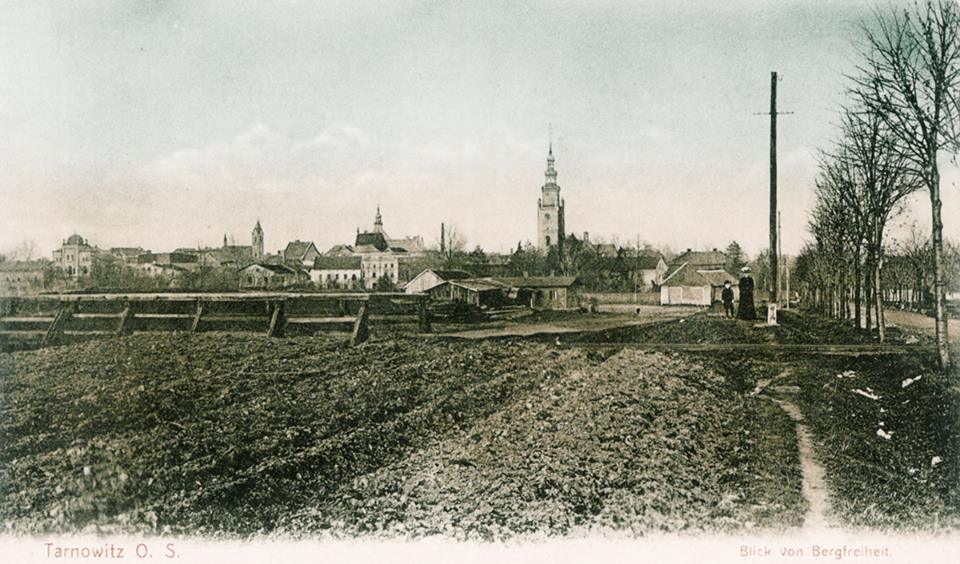
Mining areas north of Wyszyński Street (visible behind the row of trees on the right), c. 1900

A road connecting Tarnowskie Góry with the village of Tarnowice – on whose lands the town was founded – must have existed since the town's establishment in the 16th century. One of the earliest maps showing the road, part of which is the present-day Wyszyński Street, is a map of the Duchy of Opole by Johannes Wolfgang Wieland from 1736.

The boundaries of the 16th-century town were marked by three gates used mainly for fiscal purposes, one of which – the Gliwice Gate (formerly known as the Wrocław Gate) – was located at the intersection of present-day Gliwicka and Wyszyński streets. It remained in use the longest, until 1832, after which it was demolished, and only a tollhouse was left in its place.

From 1801 onward, houses began to be built along the road for miners working at the Fryderyk Silver Mine, which was located in nearby Bobrowniki. The Freedom Colony (German: Colonie Bergfreiheit) was a Frederickian colony established on the estate of Johann Gottlieb von Büttner, the heir to Stare Tarnowice.

In 1806, construction began on the road from Tarnowskie Góry to Stare Tarnowice and on to Pyskowice. The road was paved at that time. By the end of the century, however, like many streets in Tarnowskie Góry, the Stare Tarnowice road had been cobbled.

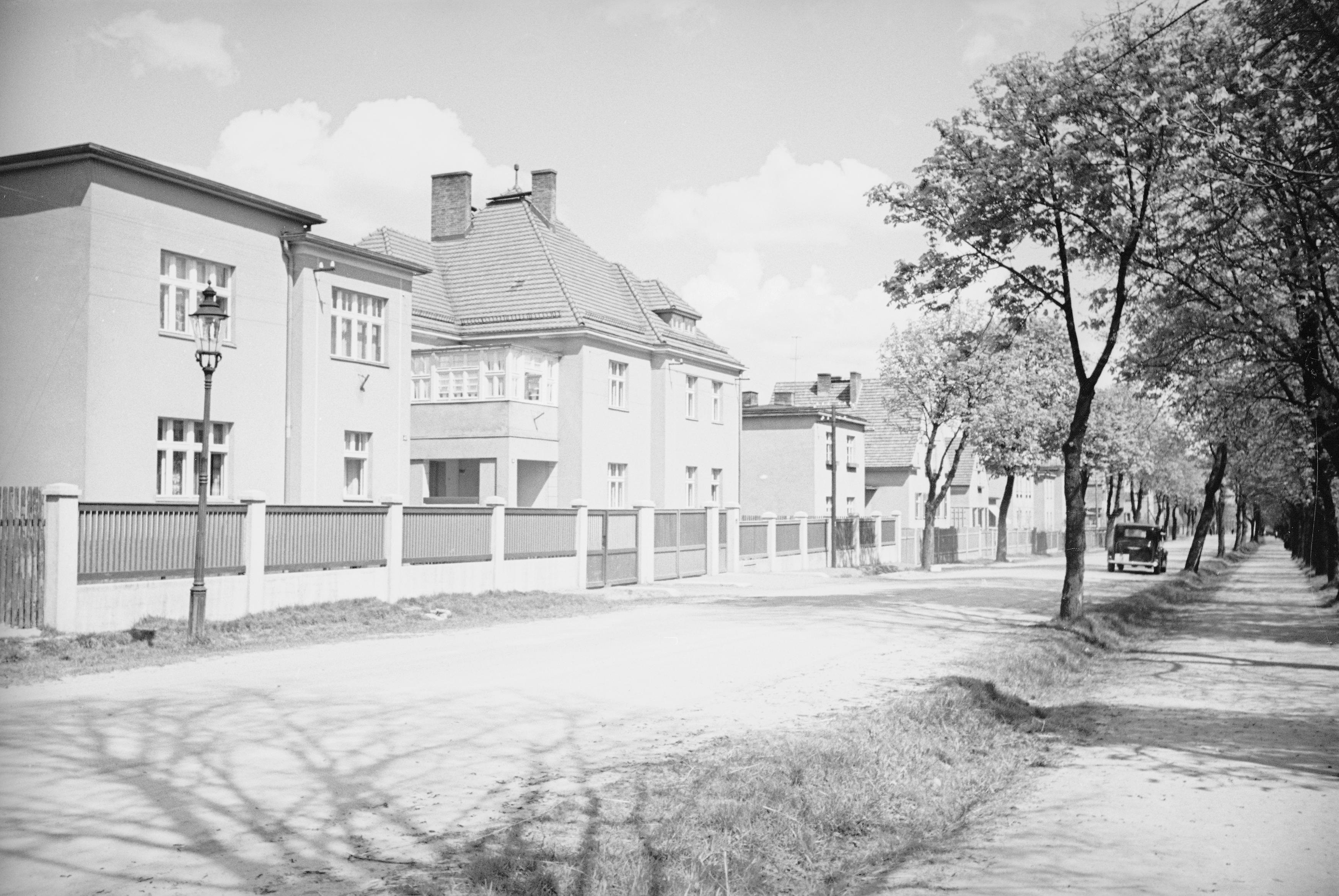
Wyszyński Street in 1937

The areas on both sides of present-day Wyszyński Street were, until the early 20th century, the site of intensive iron ore mining. Many mine shafts were located near the road, and the highway was crossed by a narrow-gauge railway track leading to the Sawina spoil tip. In 1803, during the construction of an underground drainage tunnel (the so-called Reden Cut), a 47-meter-deep shaft named Fortuna was sunk at the intersection of Alt-Tarnowitzer-Chaussee and Parkstrasse (later Parkowa Street, now Wyspiański Street). Water from the underground was brought to the surface using a hand-operated wheel and axle at the shaft. Today, the shaft is sealed off, and in its place, a small square with a flower bed surrounded by a low brick wall was established in the 1930s. A similar square was also planned for the opposite corner of this intersection, but these plans were ultimately abandoned, and the land was sold to the owners of the adjacent plots.

n 1903, on the south side of the Starotarnów Road, on land covered with mineral deposits where a limonite mine had once operated, a large park was established on the initiative of the city's mayor, Richard Otte, and the Catholic parson, Father Franz Kokott. To the west of it, two new cemeteries were established in 1916 and 1918. The cemetery founded in 1918 is the War Cemetery, where soldiers who died during World War I (and later also World War II), as well as Polish soldiers who died during the Second Polish Republic, are buried. In turn, next to the entrance gate of the New Cemetery from 1916 (St. Joseph's Cemetery), a large cemetery hall inspired by ancient Roman temples was built in 1919. In 1959, it was converted into a church dedicated to St. Joseph. Its entrance is preceded by a Neoclassical portico with a triangular tympanum supported by four fluted columns; the walls of the church are divided by pilasters on the exterior and by lesenes on the interior, and the entire building is covered by a hip roof.

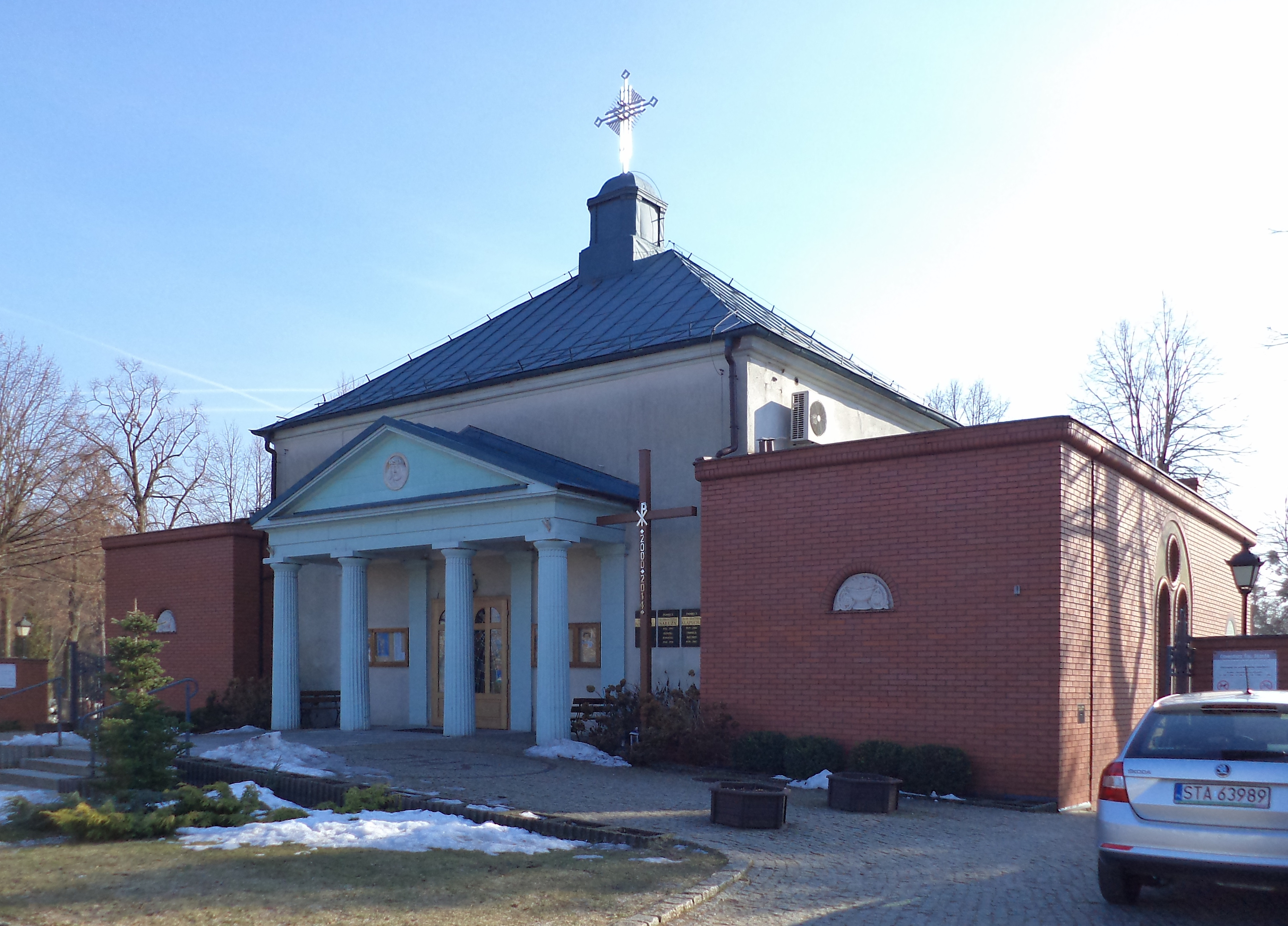
Church of St. Joseph from 1919 (photo from 2019)

The northern side of the road to Stare Tarnowice remained undeveloped for a longer time – until the early 1920s, it was covered by vast areas of post-mining barren vegetation, as well as fields and meadows. By decision of the Tarnowice municipal council, these areas were designated for the construction of homes for civil servants; the first two identical single-story villas with sloping roofs and wooden gazebos above two separate side entrance porches were completed in 1924 at numbers 17–19 and 21–23. Three years later, the city builder, Piotr Heda, built his own villa next to them. In December 1934, at 7 Starotarnowicka Street, at the intersection with Parkowa Street, the two-story home of forester Jerzy Reich was completed; it was built in the Functionalist style according to a design by architect Józef Pietrucha. The building, which still stands today, has, among other things, a spacious hall with a staircase and a semicircular veranda, above which there is a semicircular terrace with railings inspired by the so-called Streamline Moderne.

In 1948, at 1 Wyszyński Street, on the site of the former Josefshof villa belonging to Anton Klaus – the city's mayor and director of Count Ballestrem's estates – a residential building for officials of the Bracka Company was erected; the design for this building had been created as early as 1936.

== Historical sites ==
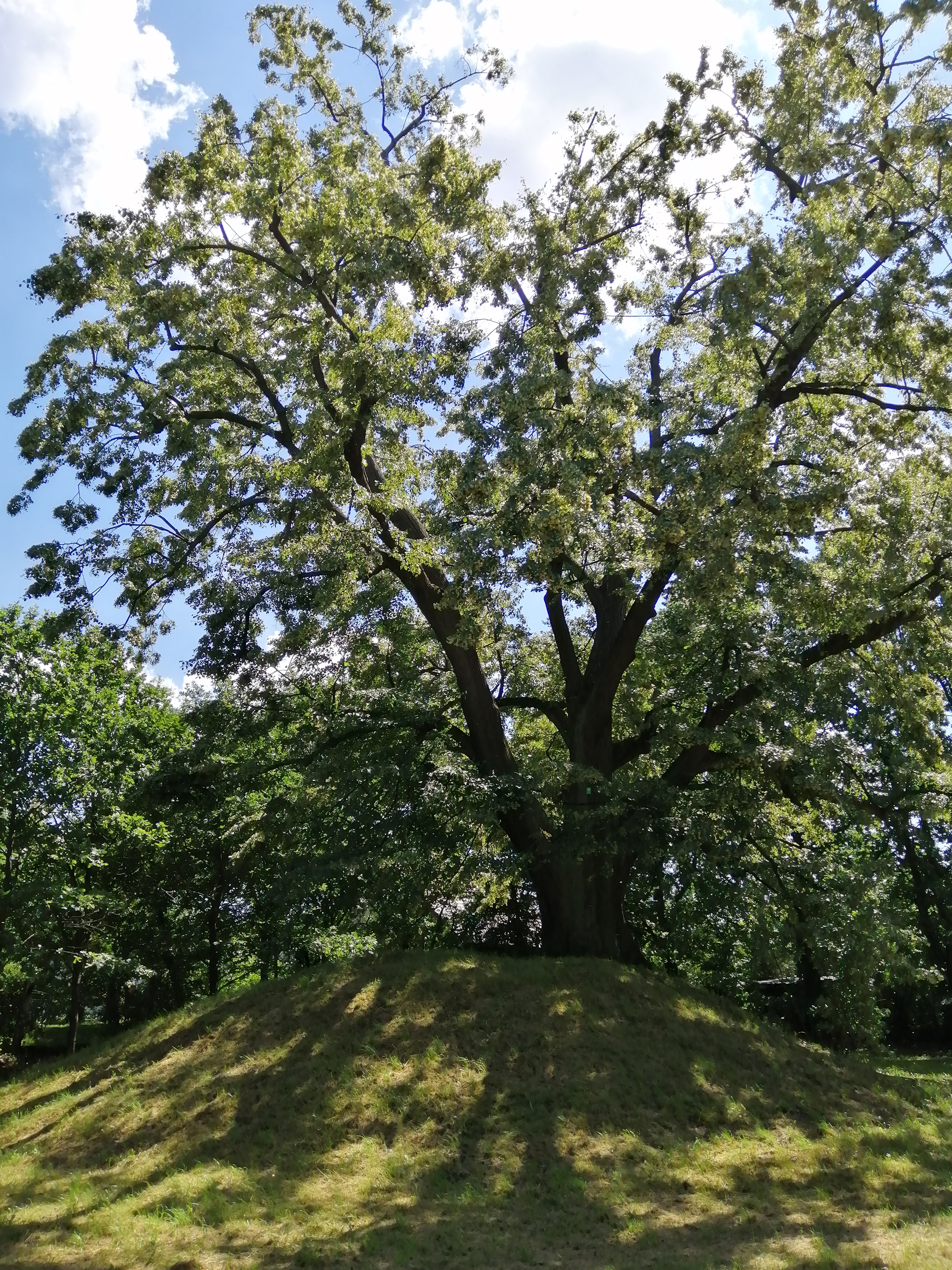
Knight's motte near Wyszyński Street in Stare Tarnowice

The oldest monument located on Wyszyński Street is a late-medieval motte-and-bailey castle near the church in Stare Tarnowice. It takes the form of a mound several meters high, atop which grows a small-leaved linden (estimated to be about 200 years old according to dendrological studies). It was the seat of the owners of the former village of Tarnowice. During archaeological excavations conducted in the 1980s, the remains of a moat were discovered around the mound, as well as the remains of a wooden structure, stone foundation, plaster, and fragments of 14th-century pottery. The site is listed in the Registry of Cultural Property (registry no. C/1332/85 of 5 June 1985) and is also included in the Gmina Heritage Register. The site, including the motte, is included in the Archaeological Survey of Poland (AZP 94-46/1).

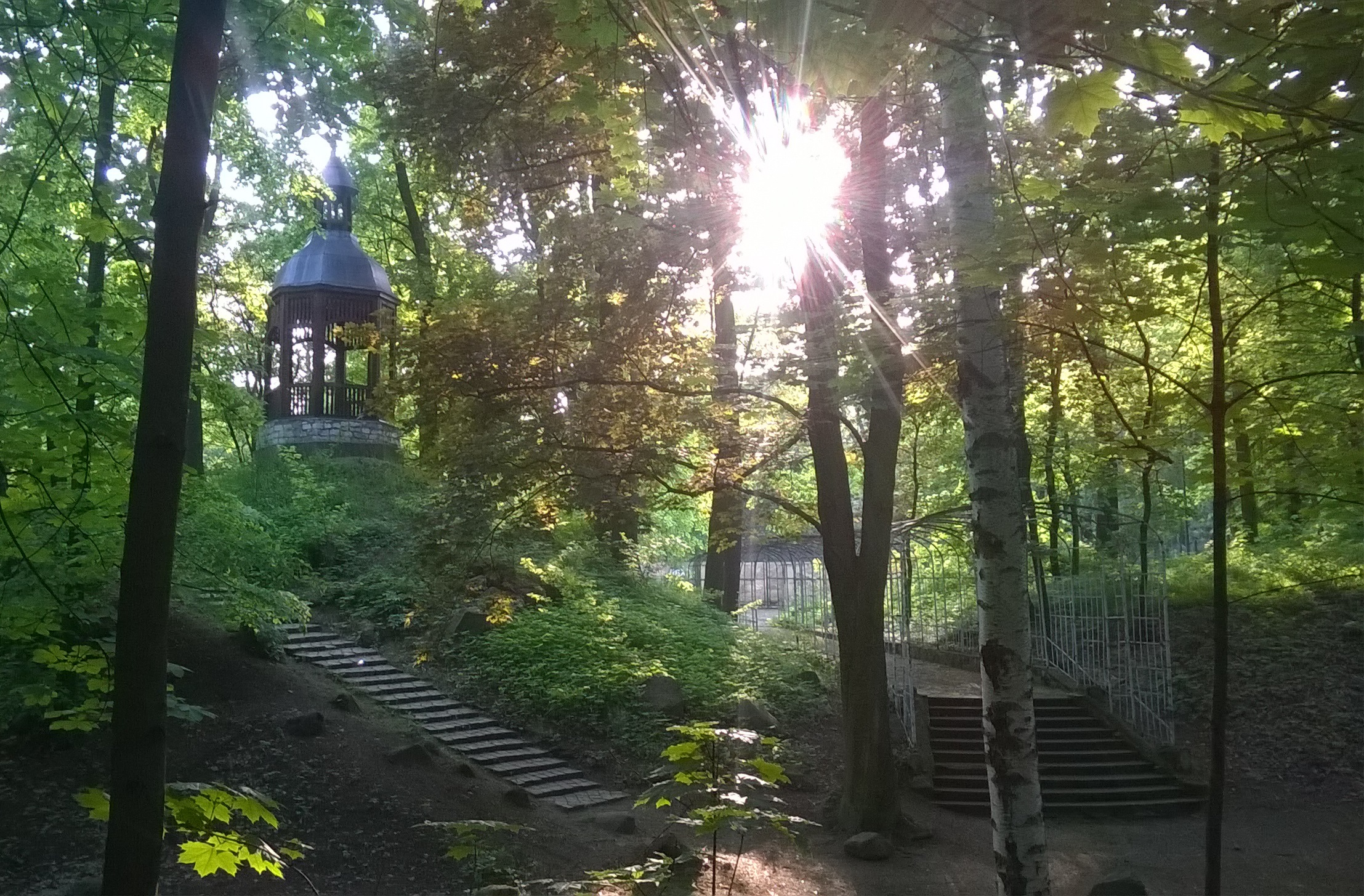
City Park on Wyszyński Street – gloriette with pergola (2016)

Another valuable landmark is the 22-hectare City Park, located on the south side of Wyszyński Street. It was established in 1903 and is one of the oldest successful examples in Europe of the revitalization of post-industrial sites and their transformation into recreational areas. In 2016, it was entered into the Registry of Cultural Property (registry no. A/483/2016 of 23 August 2016), and a year later, as one of 28 sites comprising the Lead, Silver, and Zinc Mine Complex with its Underground Water Management System in Tarnowskie Góry, it was inscribed on the Lists of World Heritage Sites. The street furniture located within the park are also covered by conservation protection as part of the entry in the Registry of Cultural Property: a wooden gloriette, a mushroom-shaped wooden gazebo, a metal pergola with stairs, a wooden kiosk, and two glacial erratics at the park's entrance from Wyszyński Street. In the western part of the park, between the municipal cemetery and the St. Joseph Parish Cemetery, there is a war cemetery complex listed in the Gmina Heritage Register, commemorating soldiers who died during World War I and World War II, with two monuments honoring the victims of Nazi terror.

The modernist buildings along the northern frontage of Wyszyński Street have also been entered in the Gmina Heritage Register. The complex consists of 11 residential buildings (including 8 villas) built or designed between 1924 and 1939 at the following addresses: 1, 3, 5, 7, 17–19, 21–23, 25, 27, 29, 41, and 47.

== Transport ==
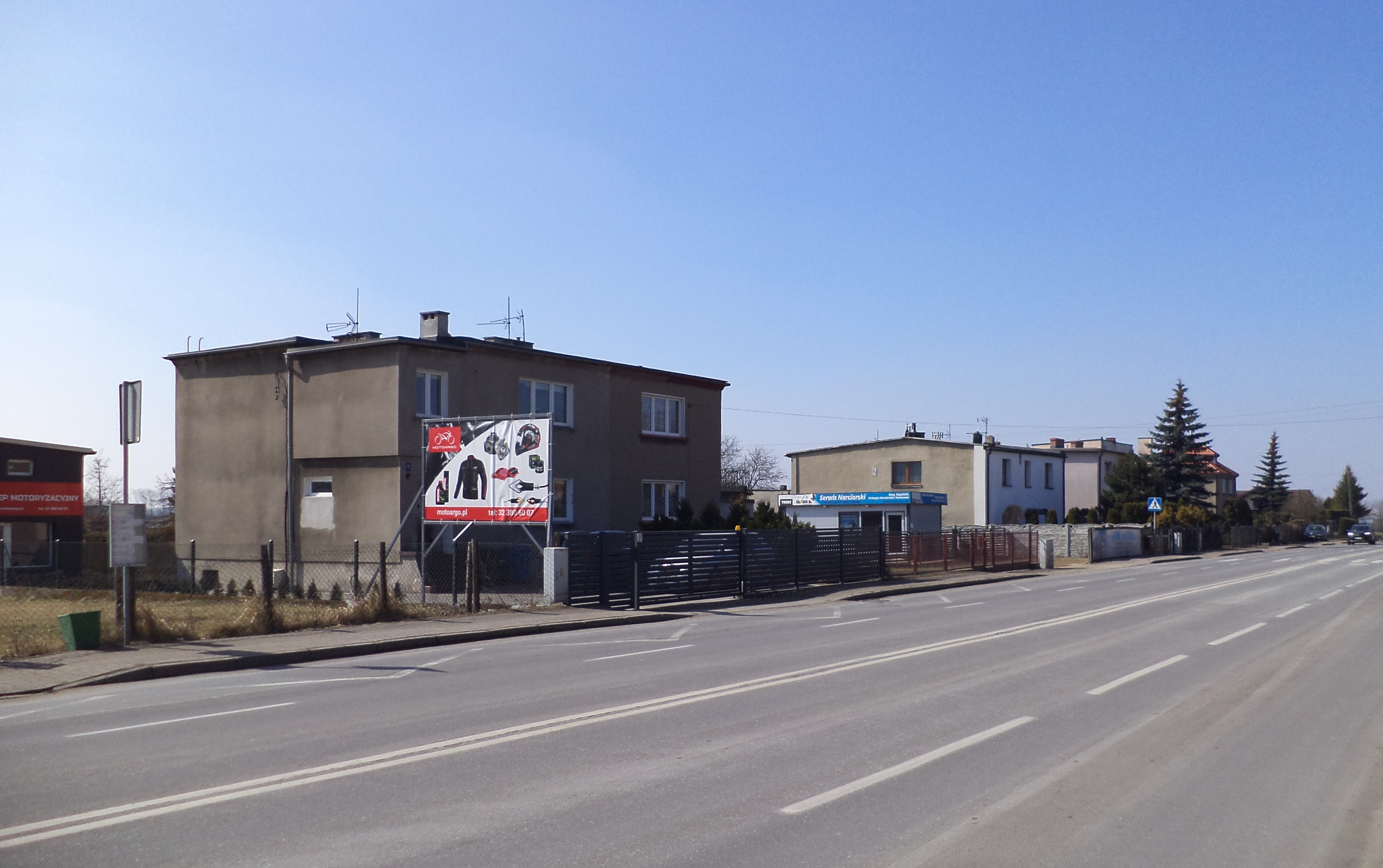
Wyszyński Street near the Stare Tarnowice Pomorska bus stop (bus stop sign on the left). The buildings of the former Bergfreiheit Colony are also visible (2018)

The following bus stops are located on the street: Tarnowskie Góry Wyszyńskiego, Tarnowskie Góry Krótka, and Stare Tarnowice Pomorska.

== Residents ==
According to data from the Registry Office, as of 31 December 2022, 625 people were registered as permanent residents on Wyszyński Street.

== Bibliography ==
- Krzykowska, Zofia (2000). "Tarnowskie Góry w okresie międzywojennym (1918–1939). Architektura" [Tarnowskie Góry in the Interwar Period (1918–1939). Architecture]. In Drabina, Jan (ed.). Historia Tarnowskich Gór [History of Tarnowskie Góry] (in Polish). Tarnowskie Góry: Museum in Tarnowskie Góry. ISBN 83-911508-3-6.
- Nadolski, Przemysław (2000). "Miasto pod panowaniem pruskim i w obrębie II Rzeszy Niemieckiej (1763–1918). Miasto i jego zabudowa" [The City Under Prussian Rule and Within the Second German Reich (1763–1918). The City and Its Development]. In Drabina, Jan (ed.). Historia Tarnowskich Gór [History of Tarnowskie Góry] (in Polish). Tarnowskie Góry: Museum in Tarnowskie Góry. ISBN 83-911508-3-6.
- Nowak, Jan (1927). Kronika Miasta i Powiatu Tarnowskie Góry: najstarsze dzieje Śląska i ziemi Bytomsko-Tarnogórskiej: dzieje pierwszego górnictwa w Polsce [Chronicle of the City and County of Tarnowskie Góry: The Oldest History of Silesia and the Bytom-Tarnowskie Góry Land: The History of the First Mining in Poland] (in Polish). Tarnowskie Góry: Polish Bookstore of Jan Nowak.
