= Ulanov =

Ulanov (Russian: Ула́нов), feminine form Ulanova (Russian: Ула́нова) is a Russian surname.

== Notable people ==
Notable people with this surname include:

- Alexei Ulanov, Russian figure skater
- Ann Belford Ulanov, American professor of psychiatry and religion
- Barry Ulanov, American writer
- Denis Ulanov, Kazakhstani weightlifter
- Galina Ulanova, Russian ballerina
- Igor Ulanov, hockey player
- Ivan Ulanov, actor
- Vladimir Ulanov, writer
- Vladimir Ulanov, sportsman

== Places ==
- Ulaniv, Vinnytsia Oblast (or Ulanov) - a village in Ukraine, located in the Khmilnyk Raion of Vinnytsia Oblast

== See also ==
- Ulanow (disambiguation)
