= Polkowice-Sieroszowice mine =

Mine in Sieroszowice, Polkowice County, Poland

Coordinates: 51.4651°N 16.1020°E

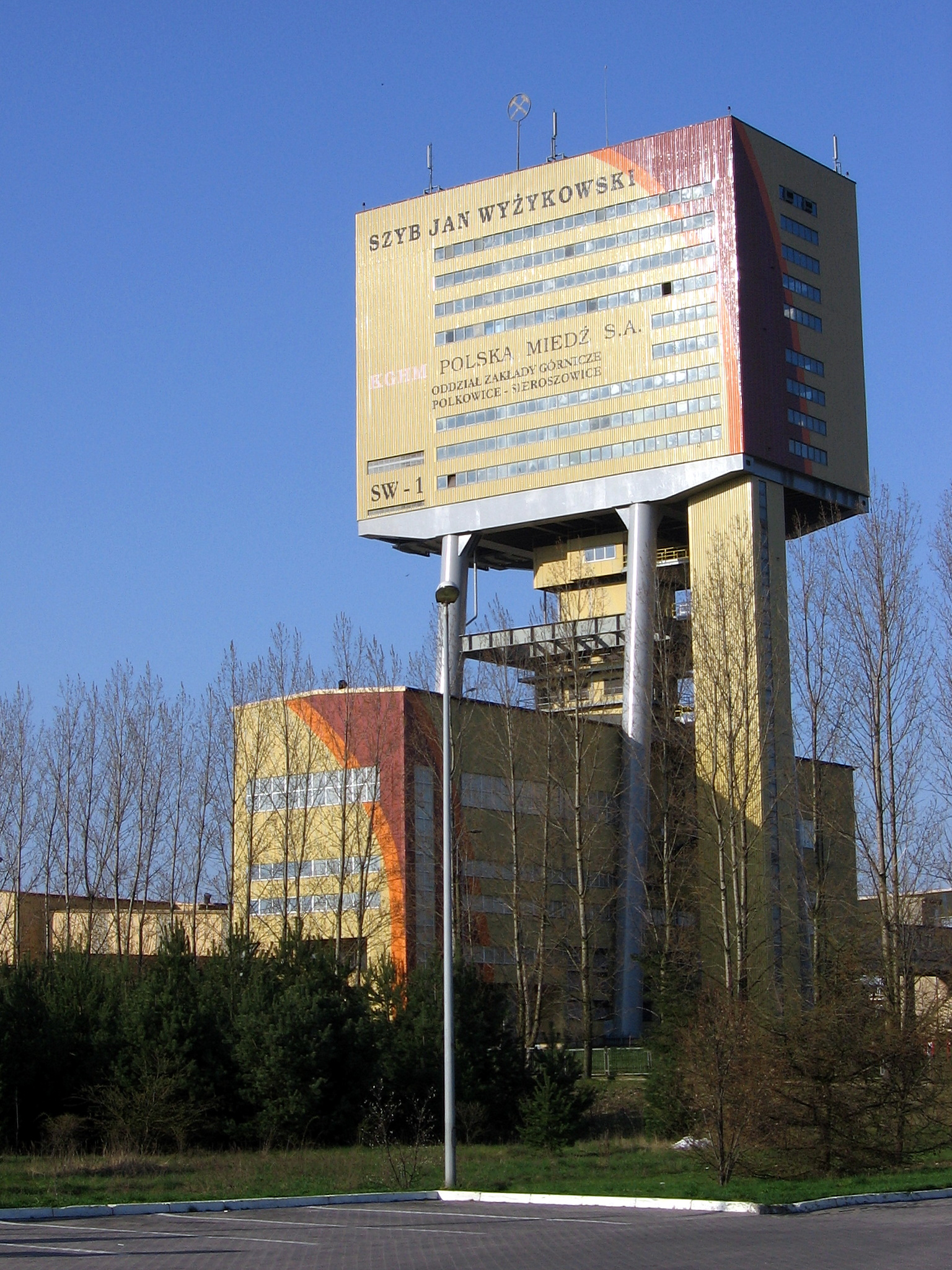
- Copper ore mine tower in Sieroszowce near Polkowice, Poland
- Interactive map of Polkowice-Sieroszowice mine
- Location: Polkowice, Sieroszowice, Polkowice County, Poland
- Products: Copper
- Opened: 1962
- Company: KGHM Polska Miedź

The Polkowice-Sieroszowice mine is a large mine in the west of Poland near Polkowice and Sieroszowice, Polkowice County, 350 km south-west of the capital, Warsaw. Polkowice-Sieroszowice represents one of the largest copper and silver reserve in Poland having estimated reserves of 387 million tonnes of ore grading 2.65% copper and 54 g/tonnes silver. In 2018, the mine produced over 196,000 tonnes of copper and over 428 tonnes of silver.
