= Żelazny Most =

Żelazny Most (meaning "iron bridge") may refer to several places in Poland:

- Żelazny Most, Lower Silesian Voivodeship in Gmina Polkowice, Polkowice County in Lower Silesian Voivodeship (SW Poland)
- Żelazny Most (lake) in Gmina Polkowice, Polkowice County in Lower Silesian Voivodeship (SW Poland), the largest sump reservoir of froth in Europe
- Other places called Żelazny Most (listed in Polish Wikipedia)
