= Żabice =

Żabice may refer to the following places in Poland:

- Żabice, Gmina Chocianów in Lower Silesian Voivodeship (south-west Poland)
- Żabice, Gmina Grębocice in Lower Silesian Voivodeship (south-west Poland)
- Żabice, Lubusz Voivodeship (west Poland)
- Zabiče in Slovenia
