= Jakubów, Polkowice County =

Jakubów
- Village
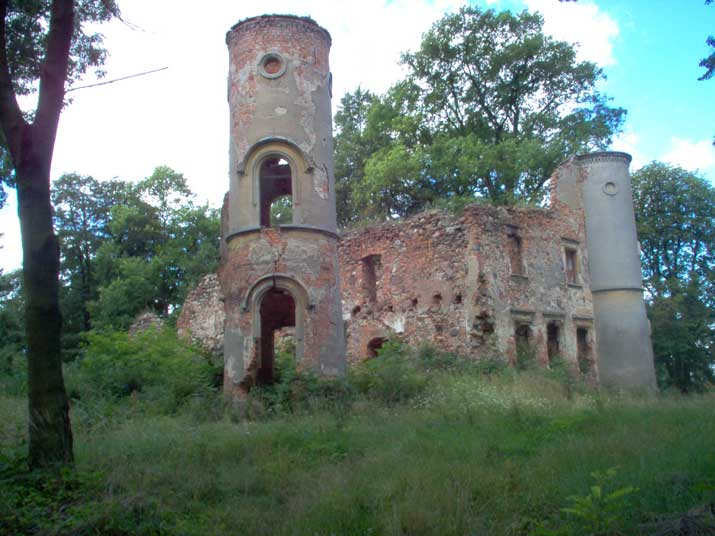
- Ruins of Jakubów Castle

- Location within Poland
- Coordinates: 51°35′N 16°00′E
- Country: Poland
- Voivodeship: Lower Silesian
- County: Polkowice
- Gmina: Radwanice
- Population: 167

Jakubów [jaˈkubuf] is a village in the administrative district of Gmina Radwanice, within Polkowice County, Lower Silesian Voivodeship, in south-western Poland.
