= Drożów =

- Village
- Location within Poland
- Coordinates: 51°36′31″N 15°58′16″E
- Country: Poland
- Voivodeship: Lower Silesian
- County: Polkowice
- Gmina: Radwanice
- Population: 70

Drożów [ˈdrɔʐuf] is a village in the administrative district of Gmina Radwanice, within Polkowice County, Lower Silesian Voivodeship, in south-western Poland.
