= Nowa Wieś Lubińska =

- Village
- Location within Poland
- Coordinates: 51°28′07″N 15°58′52″E
- Country: Poland
- Voivodeship: Lower Silesian
- County: Polkowice
- Gmina: Polkowice
- Website: http://nwl.twoja.info

Nowa Wieś Lubińska [ˈnɔva ˈvjɛɕ luˈbiɲska] is a village in the administrative district of Gmina Polkowice, within Polkowice County, Lower Silesian Voivodeship, in south-western Poland.
