= Strogoborzyce =

- Village
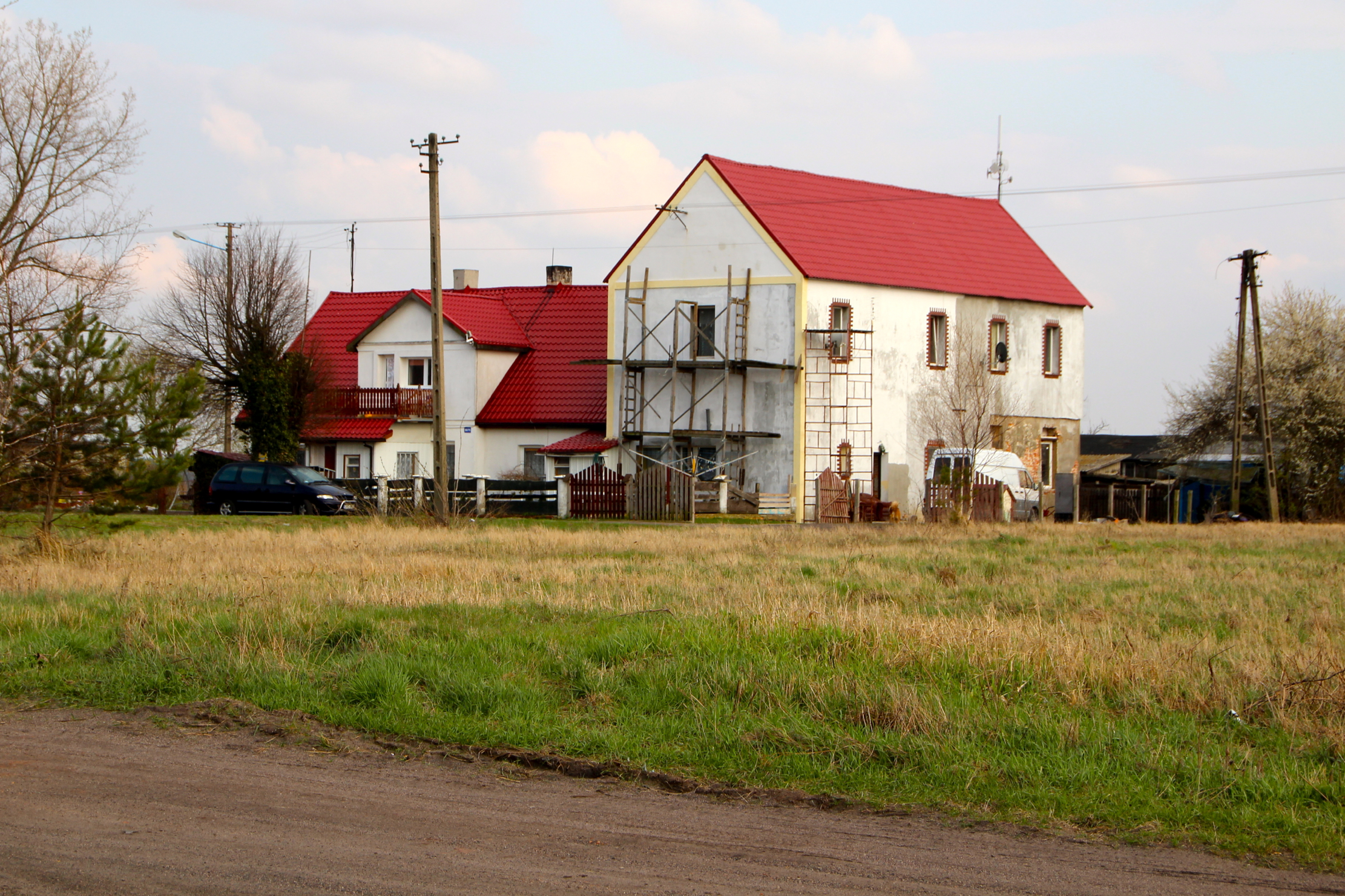

- Location within Poland
- Coordinates: 51°32′N 15°54′E
- Country: Poland
- Voivodeship: Lower Silesian
- County: Polkowice
- Gmina: Radwanice

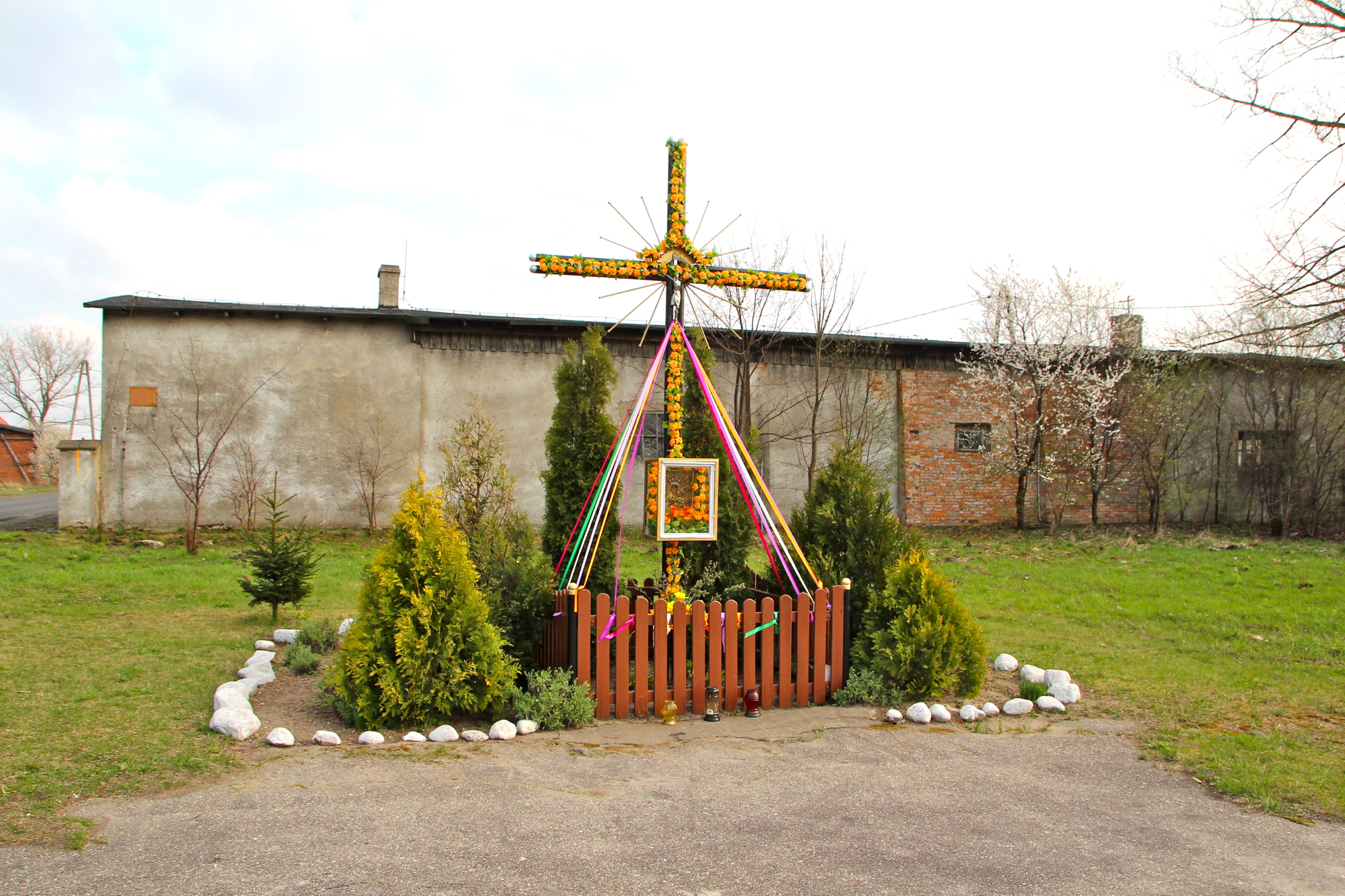
Roadside cross

Strogoborzyce [strɔɡɔbɔˈʐɨt͡sɛ] is a village in the administrative district of Gmina Radwanice, within Polkowice County, Lower Silesian Voivodeship, in south-western Poland.
