= Jędrzychów, Lower Silesian Voivodeship =

Jędrzychów
- Village
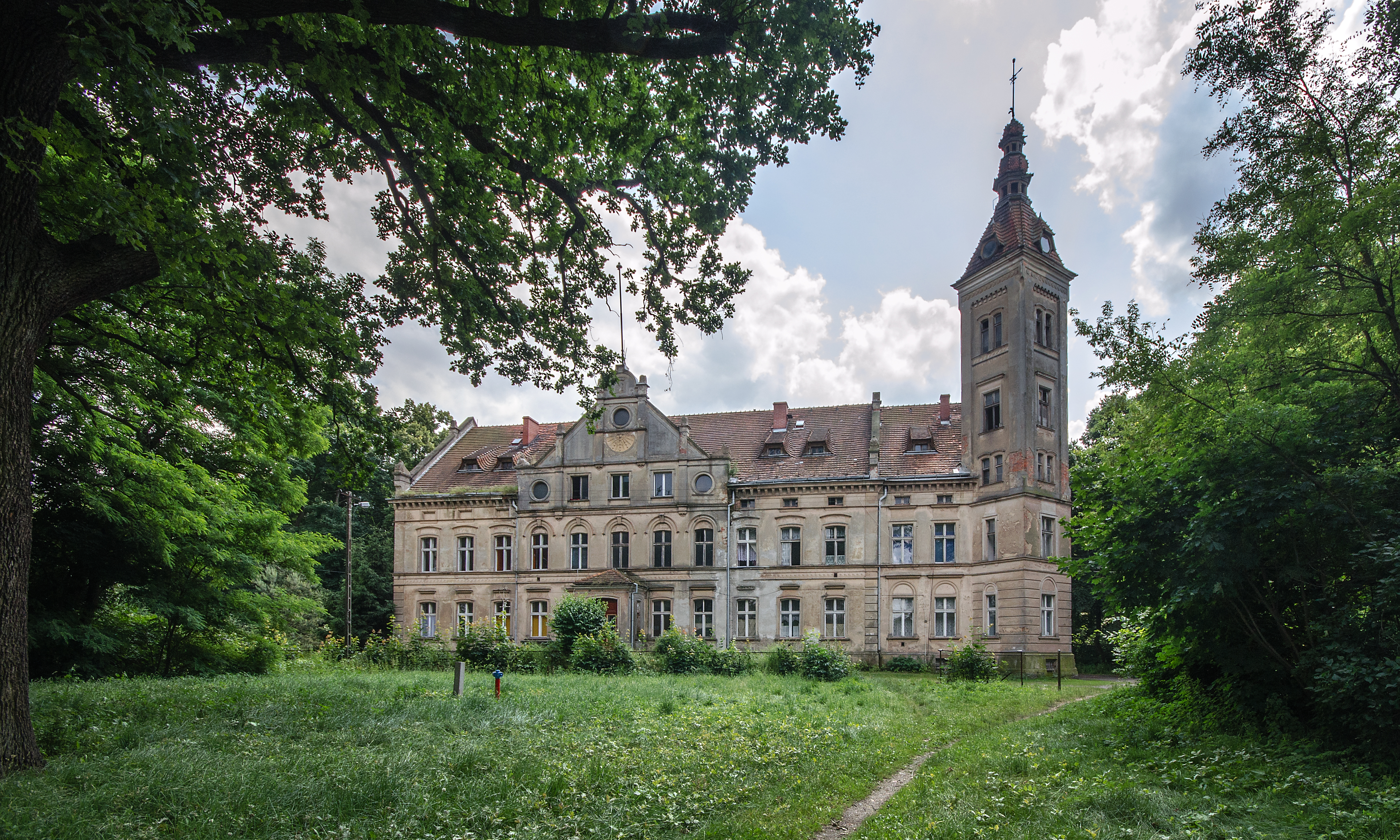
- Palace in Jędrzychów

- Location within Poland
- Coordinates: 51°27′04″N 16°02′44″E
- Country: Poland
- Voivodeship: Lower Silesian
- County: Polkowice
- Gmina: Polkowice
- Time zone: UTC+1 (CET)
  - Summer (DST): UTC+2 (CEST)
- Vehicle registration: DPL

Jędrzychów [jɛnˈdʐɨxuf] is a village in the administrative district of Gmina Polkowice, within Polkowice County, Lower Silesian Voivodeship, in south-western Poland.

Town rights were granted before 1400 and revoked before 1450.
