= Biedrzychowa =

- Village
- Location within Poland
- Coordinates: 51°28′N 16°5′E
- Country: Poland
- Voivodeship: Lower Silesian
- County: Polkowice
- Gmina: Polkowice

Biedrzychowa [bjɛdʐɨˈxɔva] is a village in the administrative district of Gmina Polkowice, within Polkowice County, Lower Silesian Voivodeship, in south-western Poland.
