= Pieszkowice =

- Village
- Location within Poland
- Coordinates: 51°28′51″N 16°08′16″E
- Country: Poland
- Voivodeship: Lower Silesian
- County: Polkowice
- Gmina: Polkowice

Pieszkowice [pjɛʂkɔˈvit͡sɛ] is a village live in the administrative district of Gmina Polkowice, within Polkowice County, Lower Silesian Voivodeship, in south-western Poland.
