= Dąbrowa, Polkowice County =

Dąbrowa
- Village
- Location within Poland
- Coordinates: 51°29′58″N 16°08′23″E
- Country: Poland
- Voivodeship: Lower Silesian
- County: Polkowice
- Gmina: Polkowice

Dąbrowa [dɔmˈbrɔva] is a village in the administrative district of Gmina Polkowice, within Polkowice County, Lower Silesian Voivodeship, in south-western Poland.
