= Ogrodzisko, Lower Silesian Voivodeship =

Ogrodzisko
- Village
- Location within Poland
- Coordinates: 51°22′01″N 16°03′05″E
- Country: Poland
- Voivodeship: Lower Silesian
- County: Polkowice
- Gmina: Chocianów

Ogrodzisko [ɔɡrɔˈd͡ʑiskɔ] is a village in the administrative district of Gmina Chocianów, within Polkowice County, Lower Silesian Voivodeship, in south-western Poland.
