= Moskorzyn =

Moskorzyn may refer to the following places in Poland:

- Moskorzyn, Lower Silesian Voivodeship (south-west Poland)
- Moskorzyn, West Pomeranian Voivodeship (north-west Poland)
