= Raków, Polkowice County =

Raków
- Village
- Location within Poland
- Coordinates: 51°22′N 15°55′E
- Country: Poland
- Voivodeship: Lower Silesian
- County: Polkowice
- Gmina: Chocianów

Raków [ˈrakuf] is a village in the administrative district of Gmina Chocianów, within Polkowice County, Lower Silesian Voivodeship, in south-western Poland.
