= Brunów, Polkowice County =

Brunów
- Village
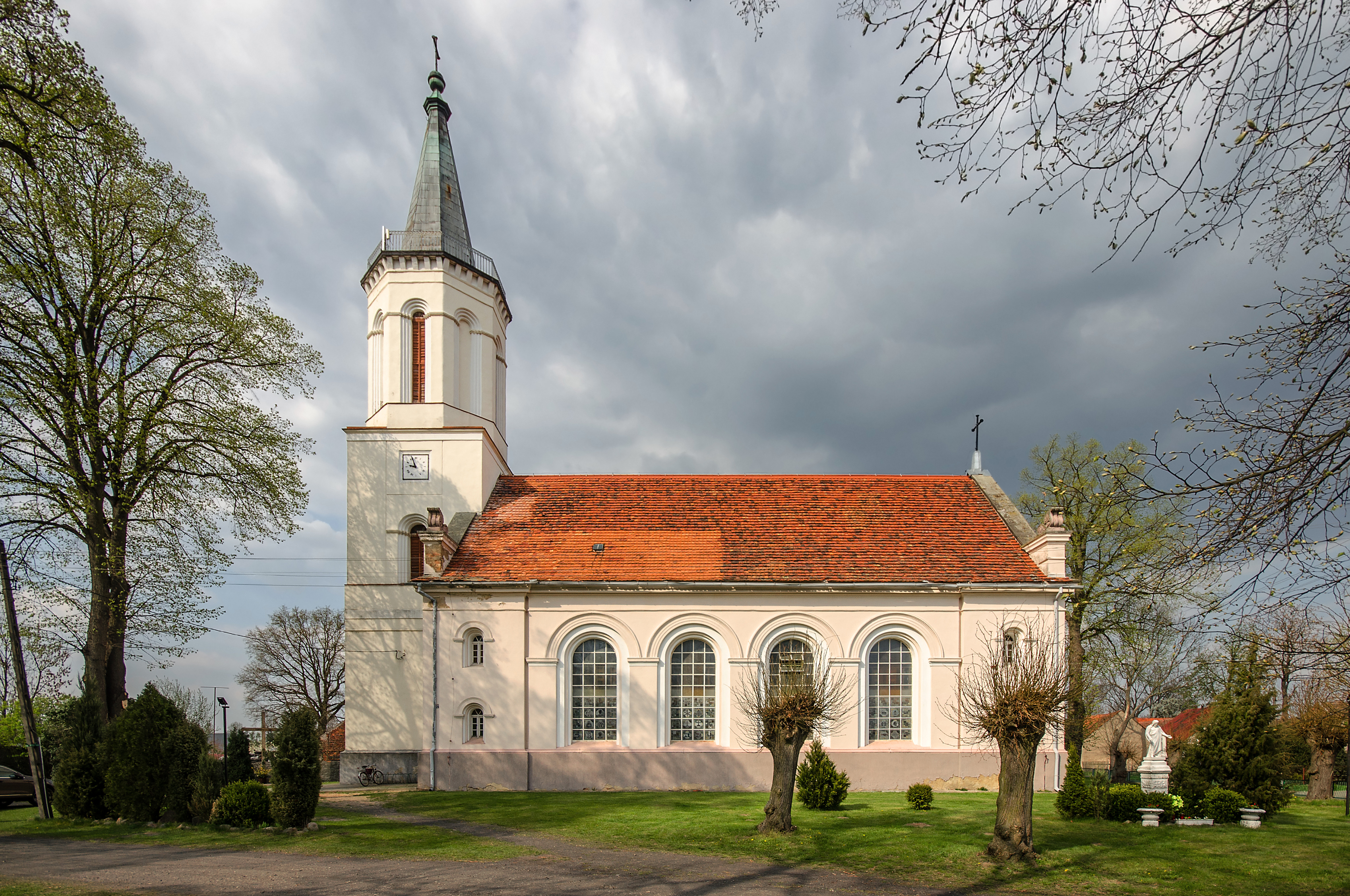
- Exaltation of the Holy Cross Church

- Location within Poland
- Coordinates: 51°23′34″N 16°03′58″E
- Country: Poland
- Voivodeship: Lower Silesian
- County: Polkowice
- Gmina: Chocianów

Brunów [ˈbrunuf] is a village in the administrative district of Gmina Chocianów, within Polkowice County, Lower Silesian Voivodeship, in south-western Poland.
