= Chocianowiec =

- Village
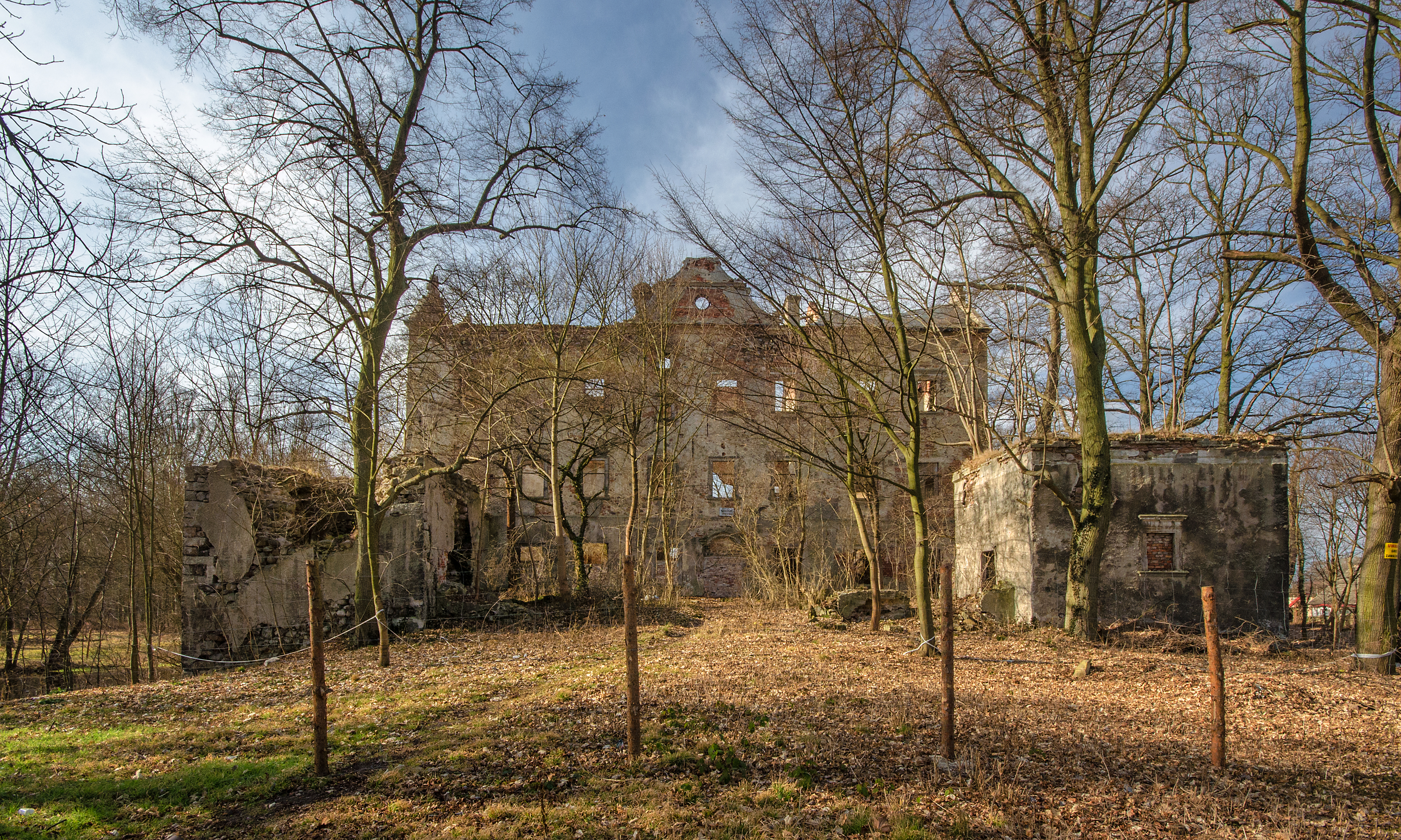
- Chateau in the village

- Location within Poland
- Coordinates: 51°23′N 15°58′E
- Country: Poland
- Voivodeship: Lower Silesian
- County: Polkowice
- Gmina: Chocianów

Chocianowiec [xɔt͡ɕaˈnɔvjɛt͡s] is a village in the administrative district of Gmina Chocianów, within Polkowice County, Lower Silesian Voivodeship, in south-western Poland.
