= Żuków, Lower Silesian Voivodeship =

Żuków
- Village
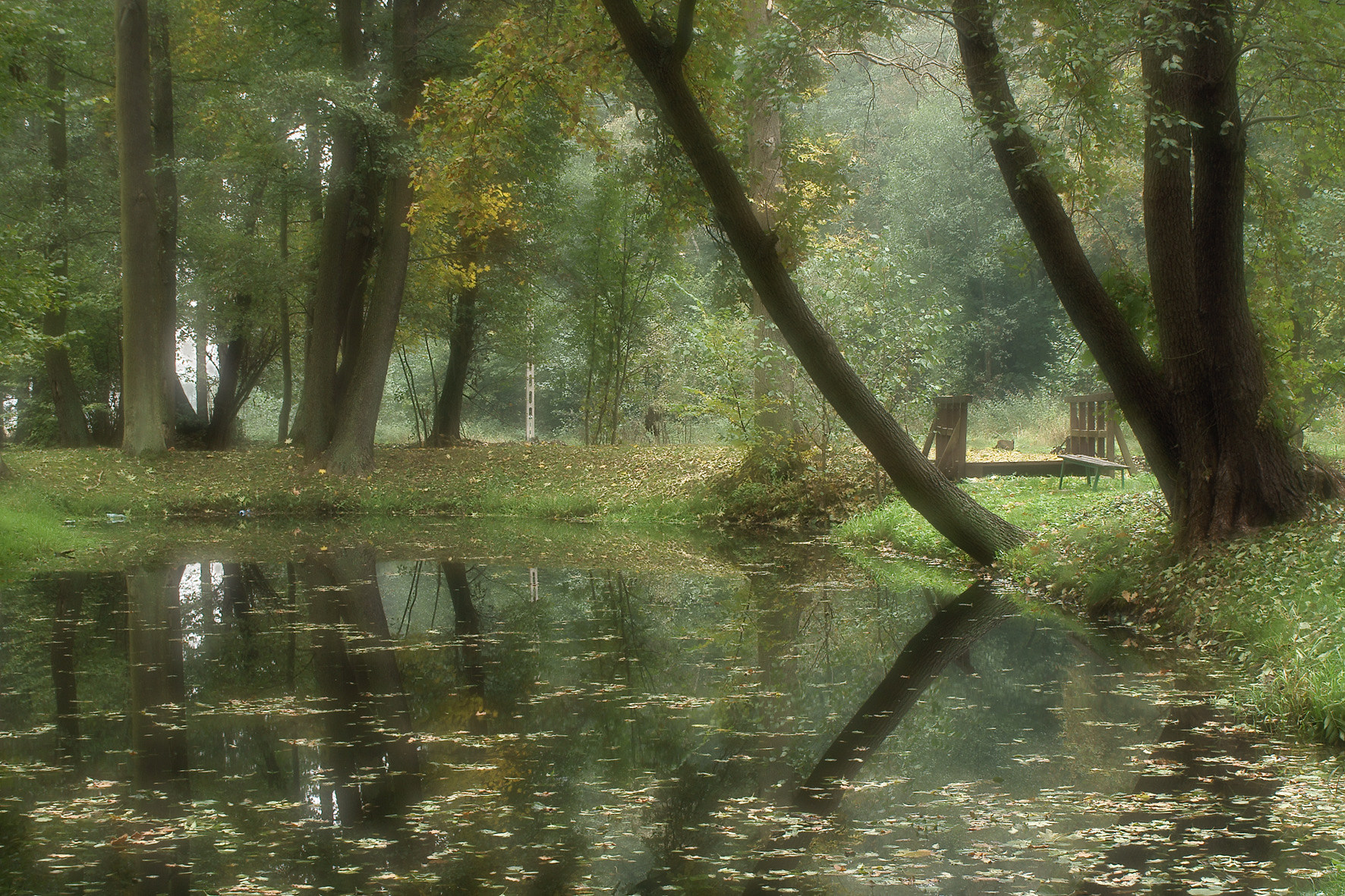
- Park

- Location within Poland
- Coordinates: 51°32′42″N 16°08′41″E
- Country: Poland
- Voivodeship: Lower Silesian
- County: Polkowice
- Gmina: Polkowice

Żuków [ˈʐukuf] (German: Suckau) is a village in the administrative district of Gmina Polkowice, within Polkowice County, Lower Silesian Voivodeship, in south-western Poland.
