= Teodorów, Polkowice County =

Teodorów
- Village
- Location within Poland
- Coordinates: 51°31′22″N 15°53′19″E
- Country: Poland
- Voivodeship: Lower Silesian
- County: Polkowice
- Gmina: Radwanice

Teodorów [tɛɔˈdɔruf] is a village in the administrative district of Gmina Radwanice, within Polkowice County, Lower Silesian Voivodeship, in south-western Poland.
