= Petro Trochanowski =

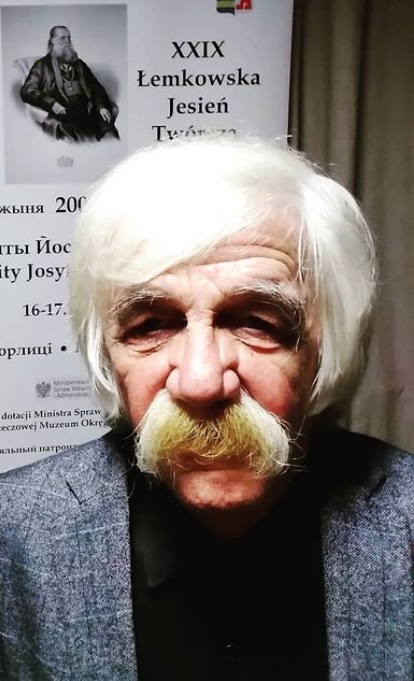
- Born: 10 August 1947 (age 79); Parchów, Silesia (southwest Poland)
- Other name: Petro Murianka
- Occupations: Poet, Editor, Folk musician
- Known for: Besida
- Relatives: Jaroslaw Trochanowski

Petro Trochanowski or Piotr Trochanowski (born 10 August 1947) was born in Parchów, Silesia in the southwestern part of Poland to Lemko parents from Binczarowa. He is the editor of Besida, published in Krynica since 1989. He is a spokesperson for the Lemko ethnic group in Poland and internationally. He is also published under the pseudonym Petro Murianka.

He was the first person who was not an ethnic Pole to win the Stanisław Piętak Prize.

== Publications ==
- Murianka, Petro; Graban, Volodislav; Zegadłówna, Zdzisława (1983). Suchy badyl [a Dry Stalk] (in Polish). Nowy Sącz: Sądecka Oficyna Wydawnicza. OCLC 69452364.
- Trochanowski, Piotr (1989). Jak sokół wodę z kamienia [Like water from a stone falcon] (in Polish and Rusyn). Warsaw: Iskry. ISBN 978-83-207-1134-9. OCLC 30750811.
- Trochanowski, Piotr (1995). Mamko kup mi knyzhku (in Rusyn). Nowy Sącz: SOWy. ISBN 978-83-85753-30-8. OCLC 46719953.
- Murianka, Petro (2001). Planetnyky : davny i novy vershy (in Rusyn). Stovarišynâ Lemkìv. ISBN 978-83-909730-4-3. OCLC 54079749.
- Trochanowski, Piotr (2008). Panteon Zelenoi Lemkovyny = Panteon Zielonej Lemkowyny (in Polish and Rusyn). Gorlytsi : Diecezjalny Ośrodek Kultury Prawosławnej "Elpis" w Gorlicach. ISBN 978-83-913884-5-7. OCLC 654490198.
- Besida (editor)

== Honors ==
- Constantine Ostrogski Prize
