= Drożyna =

- Village
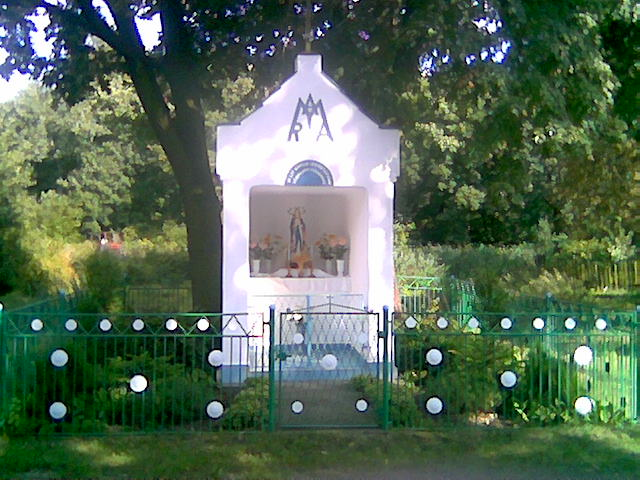

- Location within Poland
- Coordinates: 51°36′48″N 15°57′16″E
- Country: Poland
- Voivodeship: Lower Silesian
- County: Polkowice
- Gmina: Radwanice
- Population: 80

Drożyna [drɔˈʐɨna] is a village in the administrative district of Gmina Radwanice, within Polkowice County, Lower Silesian Voivodeship, in south-western Poland.
