= Szklary Dolne =

- Village
- Location within Poland
- Coordinates: 51°25′31″N 16°02′16″E
- Country: Poland
- Voivodeship: Lower Silesian
- County: Polkowice
- Gmina: Chocianów

Szklary Dolne [ˈʂklarɨ ˈdɔlnɛ] is a village in the administrative district of Gmina Chocianów, within Polkowice County, Lower Silesian Voivodeship, in south-western Poland.
