= Walenty Musielak =

Polish footballer

Personal information
- Date of birth: 7 February 1913
- Place of birth: Buchwald, German Empire
- Date of death: 11 April 1977 (aged 64)
- Place of death: France
- Height: 1.72 m (5 ft 8 in)
- Position: Striker

Senior career*
Years	Team	Apps	(Gls)
1933–1939	HCP Poznań		

International career
1936	Poland Olympic	1	(0)
- * Club domestic league appearances and goals

Walenty Musielak (7 February 1913 – 11 April 1977) was a Polish footballer who represented HCP Poznań in the 1930s. He was born in Buchwald, German Empire. Musielak made one appearance for the Poland Olympic team, in the football tournament at the 1936 Summer Olympics in Berlin, in the match against Austria on 11 August 1936, which Poland lost 3–1.
