= Kaźmierzów =

- Village
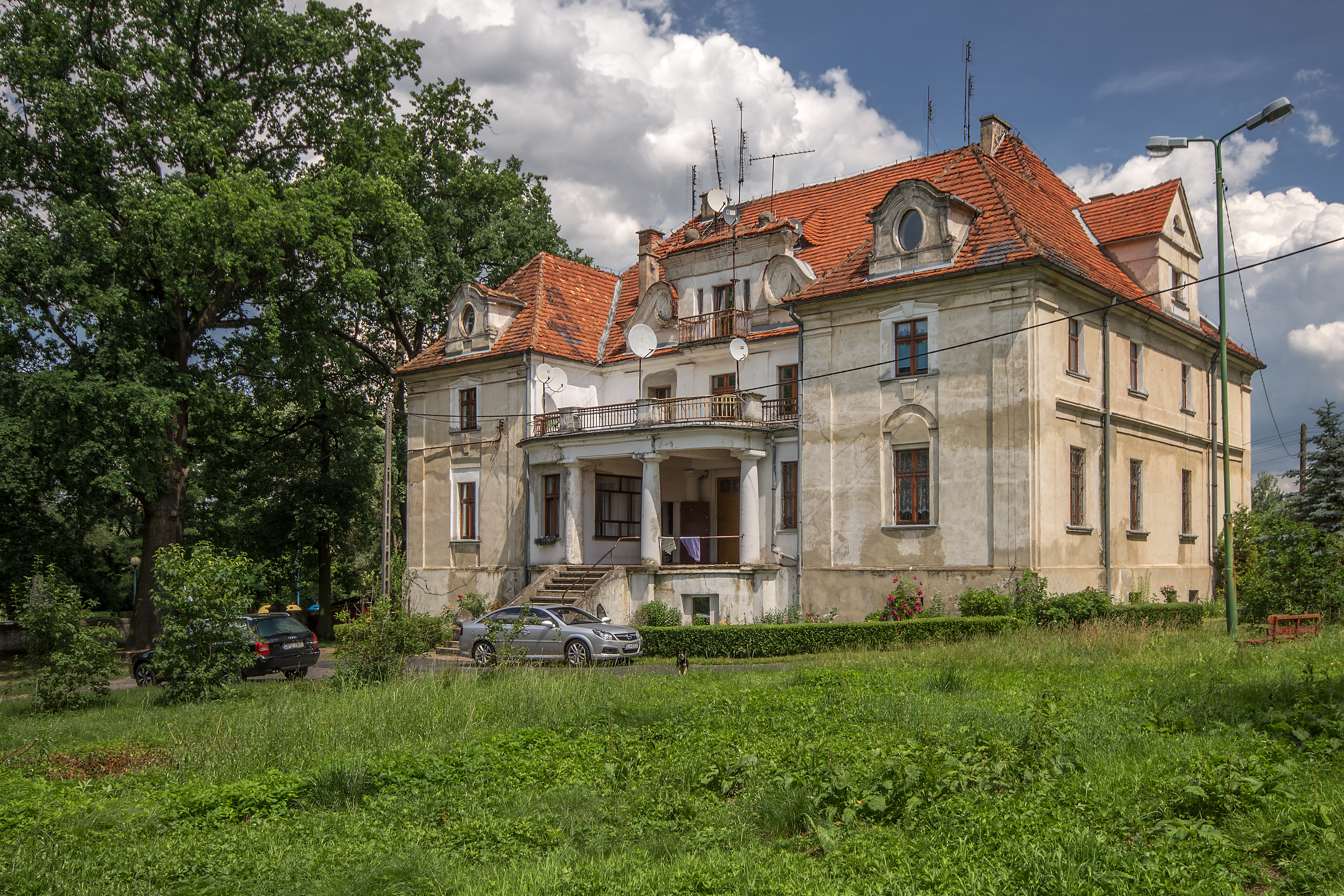
- Manor in the village

- Location within Poland
- Coordinates: 51°32′34″N 16°03′58″E
- Country: Poland
- Voivodeship: Lower Silesian
- County: Polkowice
- Gmina: Polkowice

Kaźmierzów [kaʑˈmjɛʐuf] is a village in the administrative district of Gmina Polkowice, within Polkowice County, Lower Silesian Voivodeship, in south-western Poland.
