= Łagoszów Wielki =

- Village
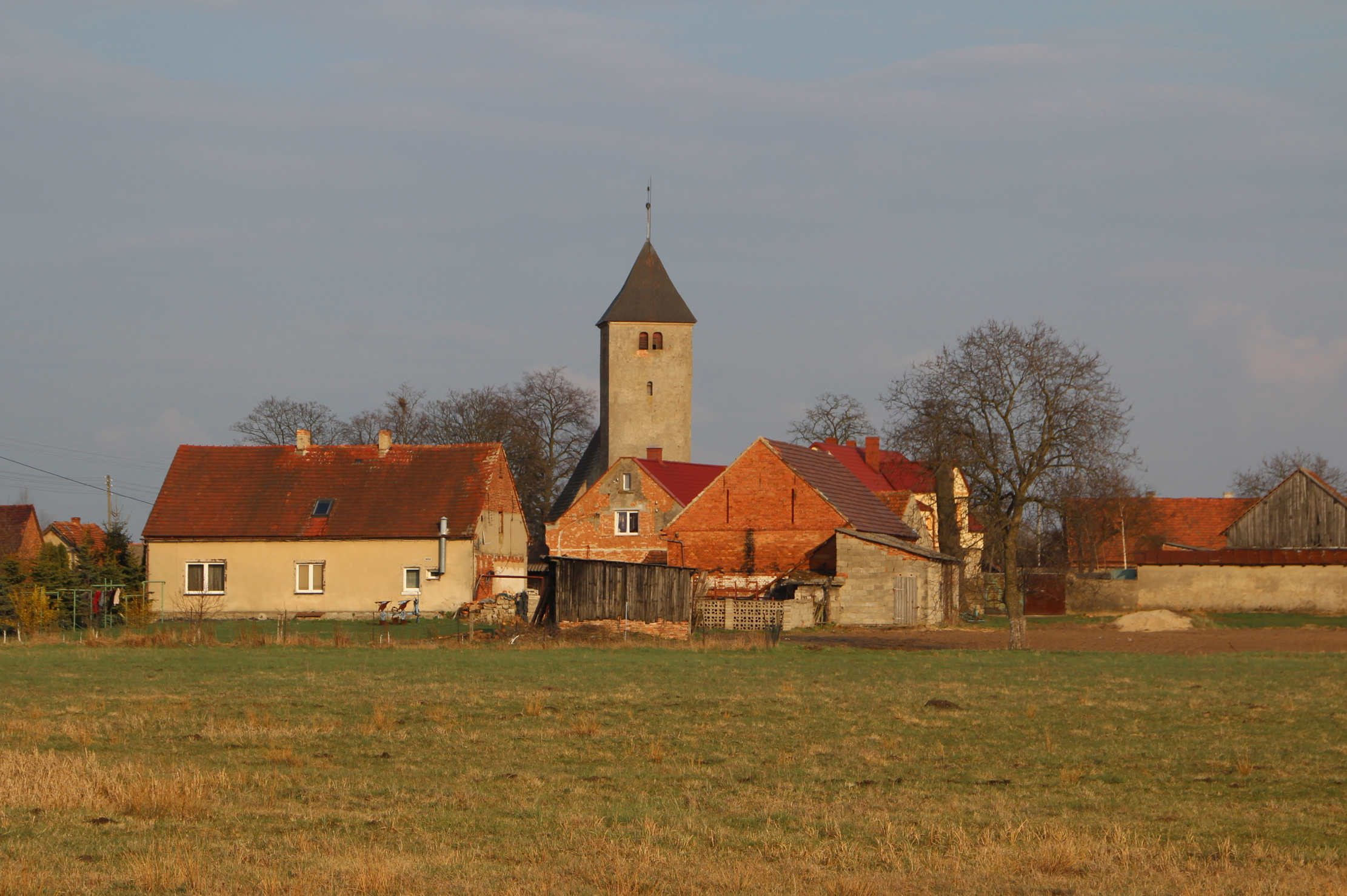

- Location within Poland
- Coordinates: 51°34′N 15°57′E
- Country: Poland
- Voivodeship: Lower Silesian
- County: Polkowice
- Gmina: Radwanice
- Population: 410
- Website: http://www.lagoszowwielki.yoyo.pl/

Łagoszów Wielki (Polish pronunciation: [waˈɡɔʂuv ˈvjɛlkʲi]) is a village in the administrative district of Gmina Radwanice, within Polkowice County, Lower Silesian Voivodeship, in south-western Poland.
