= Nowy Dwór, Polkowice County =

Nowy Dwór
- Village
- Location within Poland
- Coordinates: 51°32′N 15°54′E
- Country: Poland
- Voivodeship: Lower Silesian
- County: Polkowice
- Gmina: Radwanice

Nowy Dwór [ˈnɔvɨ ˈdvur] is a village in the administrative district of Gmina Radwanice, within Polkowice County, Lower Silesian Voivodeship, in south-western Poland.
