= Sobin, Lower Silesian Voivodeship =

Sobin
- Village
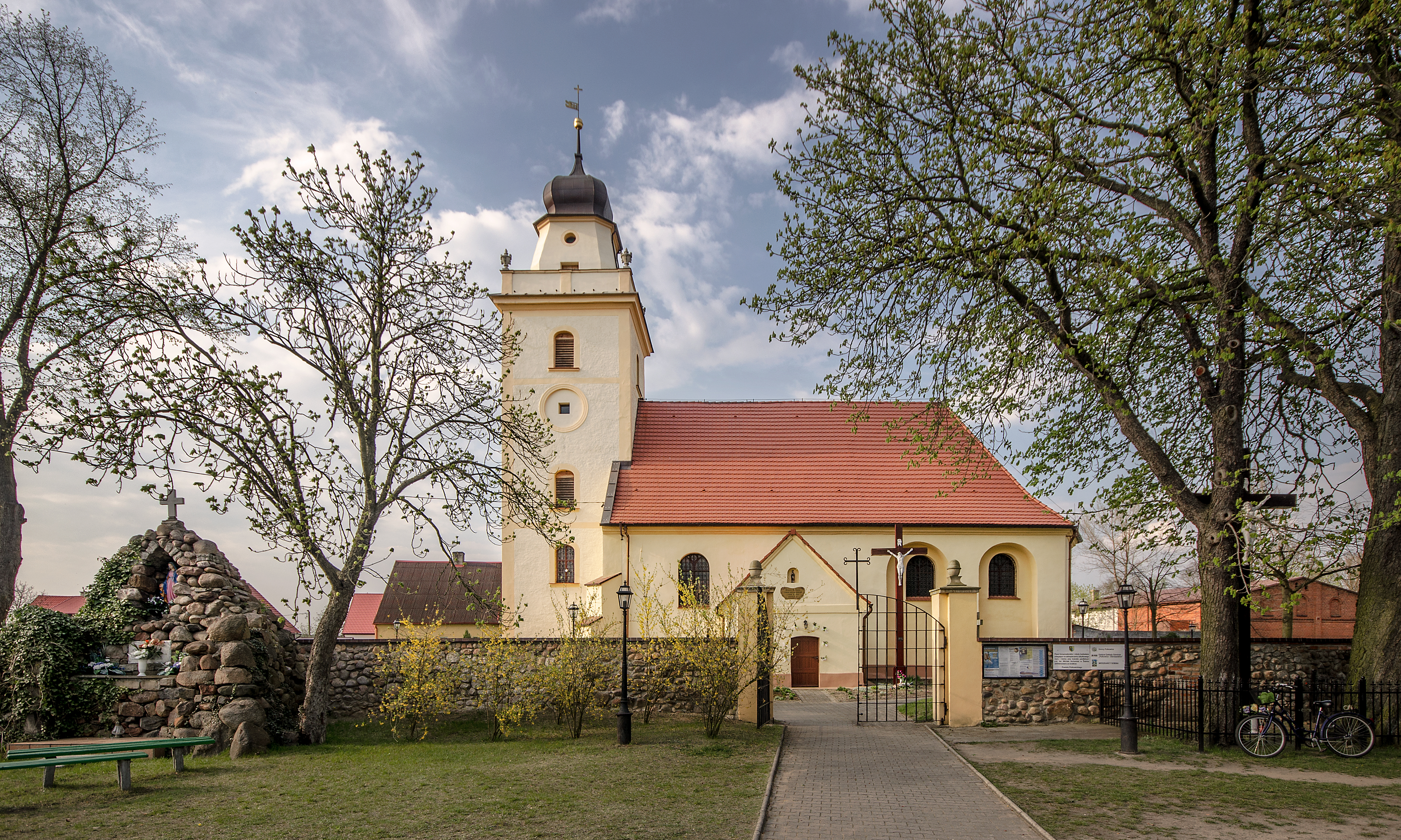

- Location within Poland
- Coordinates: 51°28′29″N 16°01′39″E
- Country: Poland
- Voivodeship: Lower Silesian
- County: Polkowice
- Gmina: Polkowice
- Population (approx.): 750

Sobin [ˈsɔbin] is a village in the administrative district of Gmina Polkowice, within Polkowice County, Lower Silesian Voivodeship, in south-western Poland.
