= Kłębanowice, Polkowice County =

Kłębanowice
- Village
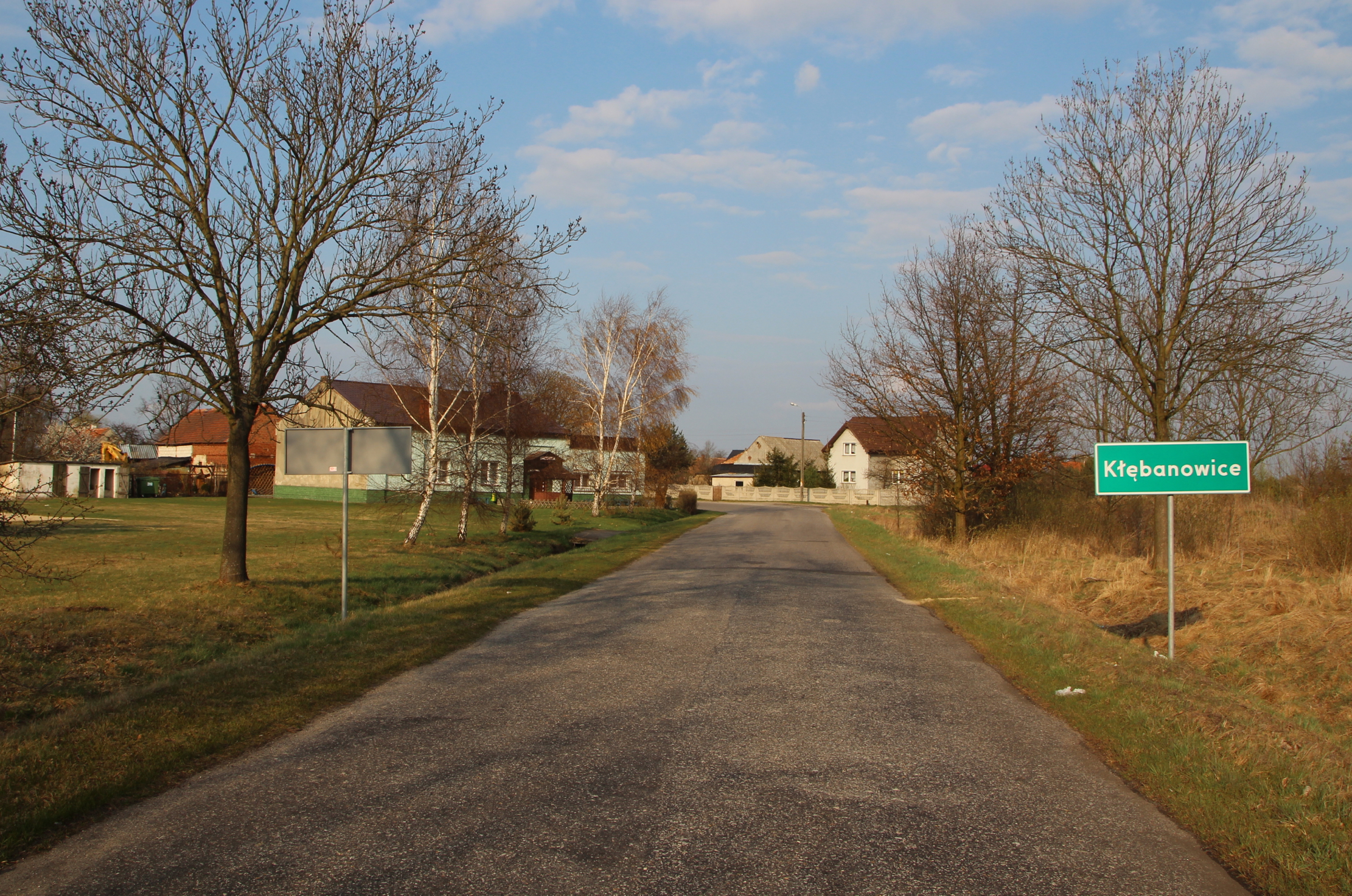

- Location within Poland
- Coordinates: 51°32′47″N 15°56′37″E
- Country: Poland
- Voivodeship: Lower Silesian
- County: Polkowice
- Gmina: Radwanice

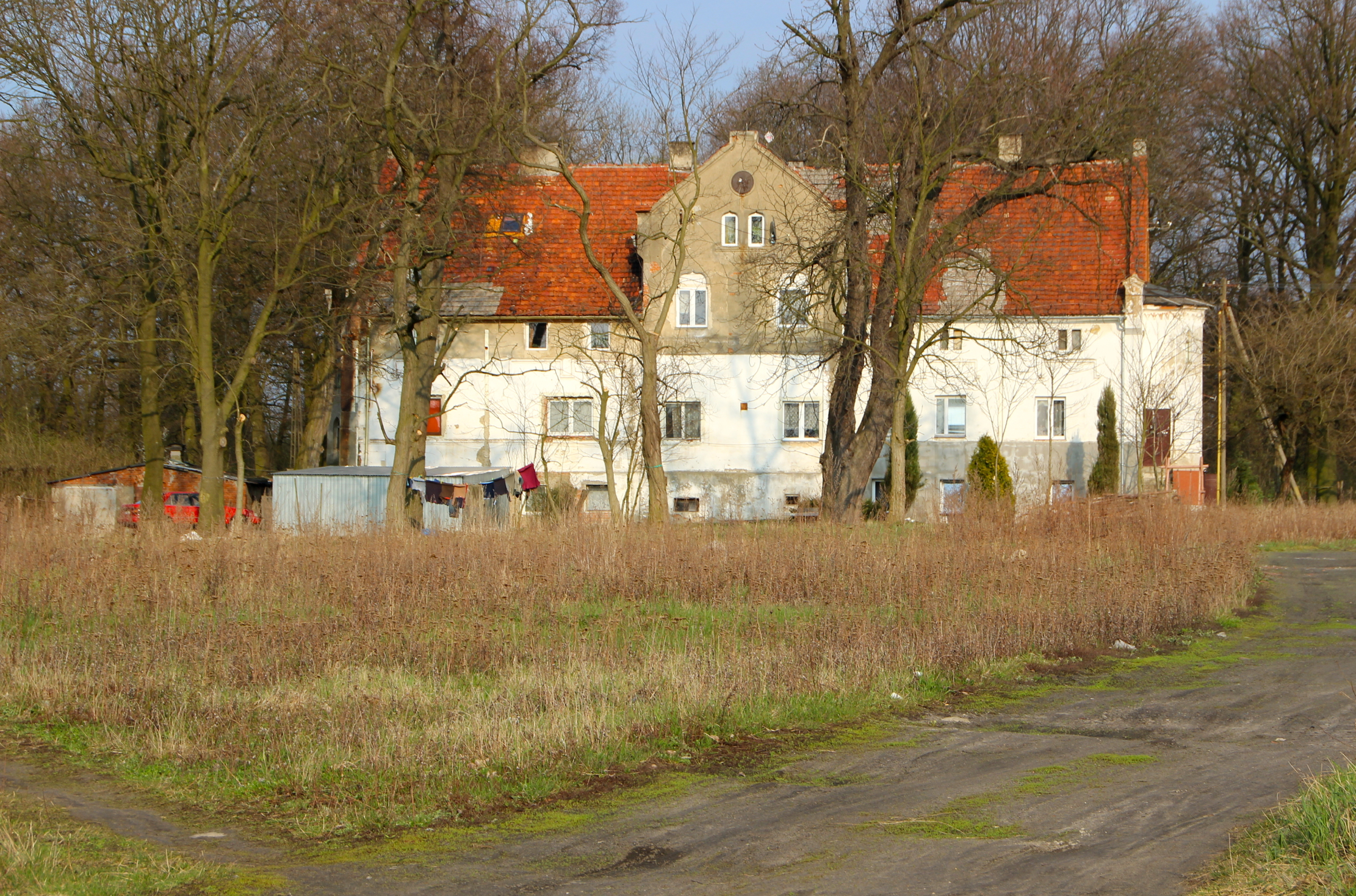
Kłębanowice

Kłębanowice [kwɛmbanɔˈvit͡sɛ] is a village in the administrative district of Gmina Radwanice, within Polkowice County, Lower Silesian Voivodeship, in south-western Poland.
