= Trzmielów =

- Village
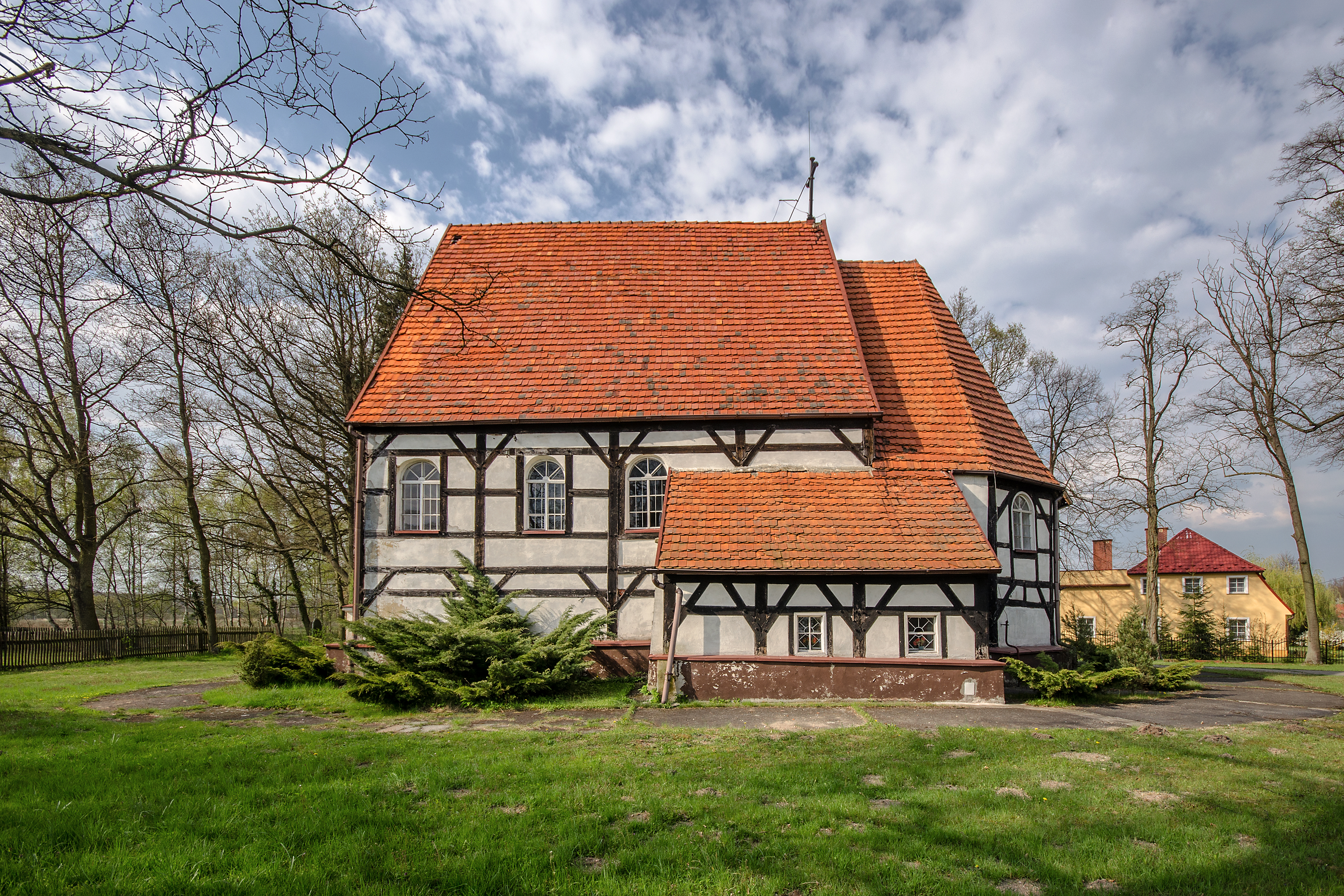

- Location within Poland
- Coordinates: 51°25′53″N 16°00′31″E
- Country: Poland
- Voivodeship: Lower Silesian
- County: Polkowice
- Gmina: Chocianów

Trzmielów [ˈtʂmjɛluf] (German: Hummel) is a village in the administrative district of Gmina Chocianów, within Polkowice County, Lower Silesian Voivodeship, in south-western Poland.
