= Eichbach =

Eichbach may refer to:

- Komorniki, Polkowice County (German name Eichbach), a village in the Lower Silesian Voivodeship, Poland
- Eichbach (Hahle), a river of Thuringia, Germany, tributary of the Hahle
- Eichbach (Weibersbach), a river of Hesse and of Bavaria, Germany, headwater of the Weibersbach
