= Trzebcz =

- Village
- Location within Poland
- Coordinates: 51°31′06″N 16°06′37″E
- Country: Poland
- Voivodeship: Lower Silesian
- County: Polkowice
- Gmina: Polkowice
- Population: 200
- Website: http://www.trzebcz.eu

Trzebcz [tʂɛpt͡ʂ] is a village in the administrative district of Gmina Polkowice, within Polkowice County, Lower Silesian Voivodeship, in south-western Poland.
