= Jabłonów, Lower Silesian Voivodeship =

Jabłonów
- Village
- Location within Poland
- Coordinates: 51°30′15″N 15°54′58″E
- Country: Poland
- Voivodeship: Lower Silesian
- County: Polkowice
- Gmina: Chocianów

Jabłonów [jaˈbwɔnuf] is a village in the administrative district of Gmina Chocianów, within Polkowice County, Lower Silesian Voivodeship, in south-western Poland.
