= Lipin, Lower Silesian Voivodeship =

Lipin
- Village
- Location within Poland
- Coordinates: 51°34′51″N 15°56′03″E
- Country: Poland
- Voivodeship: Lower Silesian
- County: Polkowice
- Gmina: Radwanice

Lipin [ˈlipin] is a village in the administrative district of Gmina Radwanice, within Polkowice County, Lower Silesian Voivodeship, in south-western Poland.
