= Nowa Kuźnia, Polkowice County =

Nowa Kuźnia
- Village
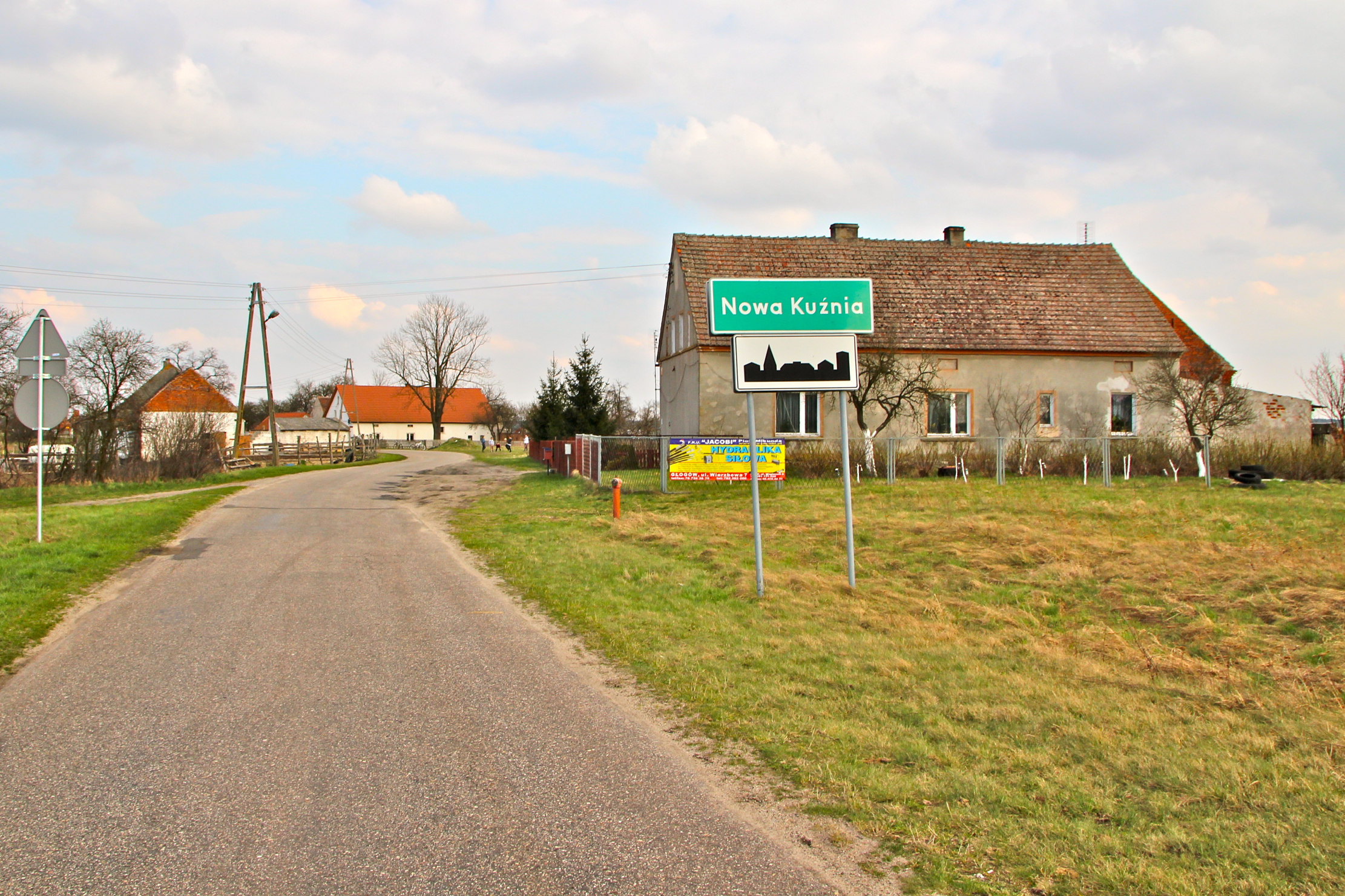

- Location within Poland
- Coordinates: 51°31′15″N 15°53′45″E
- Country: Poland
- Voivodeship: Lower Silesian
- County: Polkowice
- Gmina: Radwanice

Nowa Kuźnia [ˈnɔva ˈkuʑɲa] is a village in the administrative district of Gmina Radwanice, within Polkowice County, Lower Silesian Voivodeship, in south-western Poland.
