= Dobromil, Lower Silesian Voivodeship =

Dobromil
- Village
- Location within Poland
- Coordinates: 51°34′54″N 15°59′17″E
- Country: Poland
- Voivodeship: Lower Silesian
- County: Polkowice
- Gmina: Radwanice

Dobromil [dɔˈbrɔmil] is a village in the administrative district of Gmina Radwanice, within Polkowice County, Lower Silesian Voivodeship, in south-western Poland.
