= Michałów, Polkowice County =

Michałów
- Village
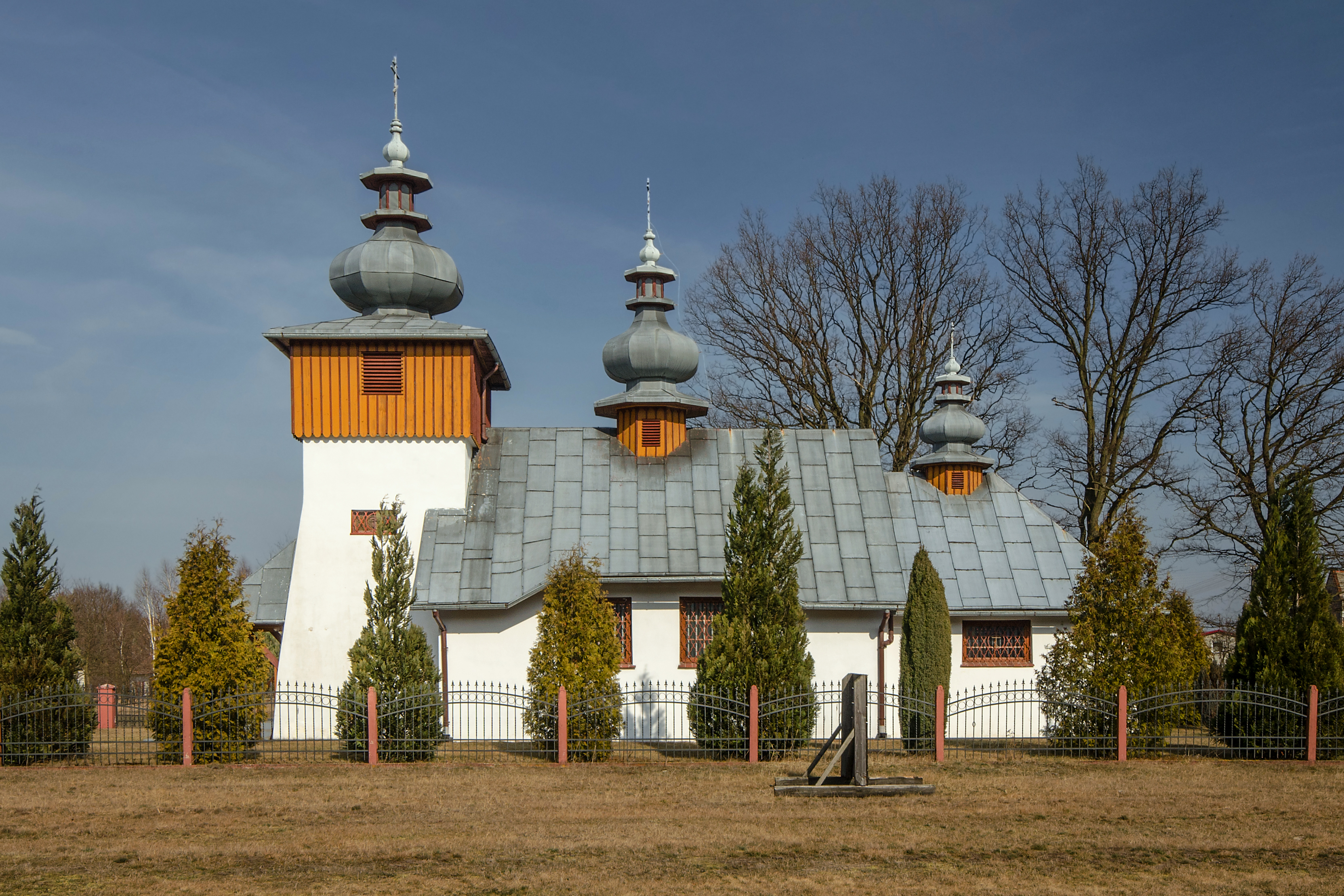
- Saint Michael Archangel Orthodox church in Michałów

- Location within Poland
- Coordinates: 51°21′19″N 16°00′03″E
- Country: Poland
- Voivodeship: Lower Silesian
- County: Polkowice
- Gmina: Chocianów

Michałów [miˈxawuf] is a village in the administrative district of Gmina Chocianów, within Polkowice County, Lower Silesian Voivodeship, in south-western Poland.
