= Borów, Polkowice County =

Borów
- Village
- Location within Poland
- Coordinates: 51°35′30″N 15°58′28″E
- Country: Poland
- Voivodeship: Lower Silesian
- County: Polkowice
- Gmina: Radwanice

Borów [ˈbɔruf] is a village in the administrative district of Gmina Radwanice, within Polkowice County, Lower Silesian Voivodeship, in south-western Poland.
