= Tarnówek, Lower Silesian Voivodeship =

Tarnówek
- Village
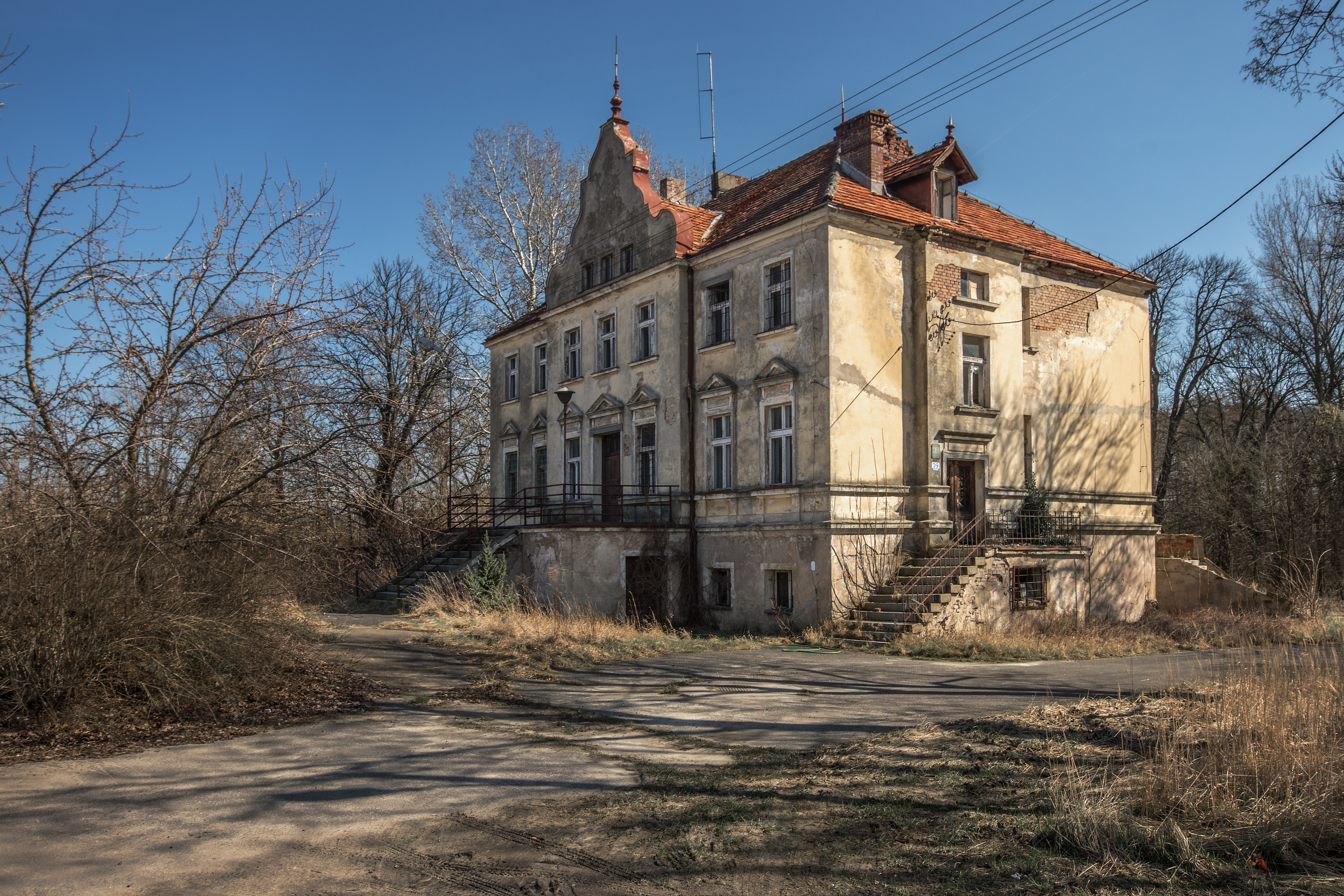

- Location within Poland
- Coordinates: 51°30′44″N 16°09′39″E
- Country: Poland
- Voivodeship: Lower Silesian
- County: Polkowice
- Gmina: Polkowice

Tarnówek [tarˈnuvɛk] is a village in the administrative district of Gmina Polkowice, within Polkowice County, Lower Silesian Voivodeship, in south-western Poland.
