= Pogorzeliska =

- Village
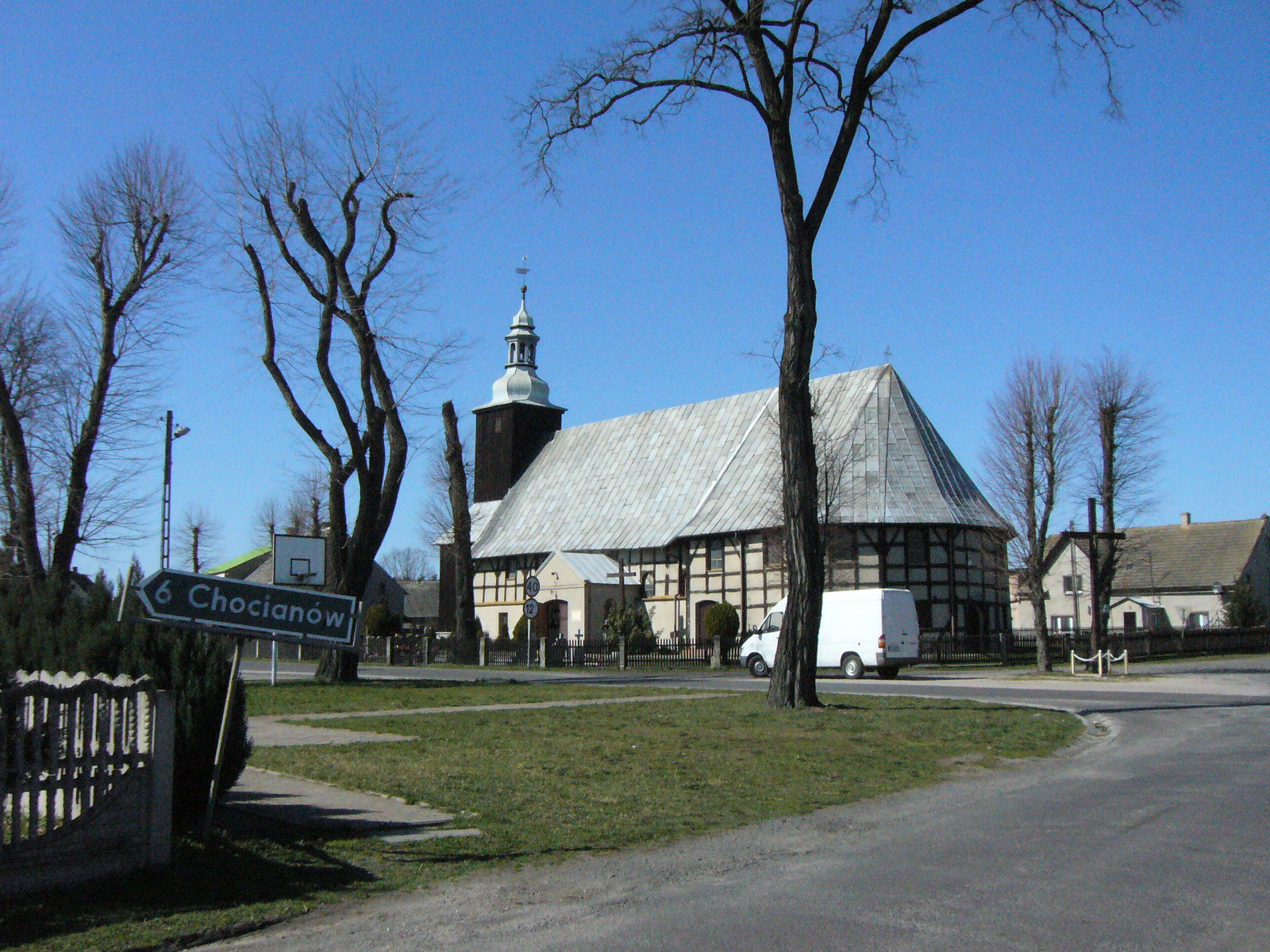
- Catholic church

- Location within Poland
- Coordinates: 51°28′N 15°55′E
- Country: Poland
- Voivodeship: Lower Silesian
- County: Polkowice
- Gmina: Chocianów
- Population: 200

Pogorzeliska [pɔɡɔʐɛˈliska] is a village in the administrative district of Gmina Chocianów, within Polkowice County, Lower Silesian Voivodeship, in south-western Poland.
