= Guzice =

- Village
- Location within Poland
- Coordinates: 51°31′53″N 16°06′07″E
- Country: Poland
- Voivodeship: Lower Silesian
- County: Polkowice
- Gmina: Polkowice

Guzice [ɡuˈʑit͡sɛ] is a village in the administrative district of Gmina Polkowice, within Polkowice County, Lower Silesian Voivodeship, in south-western Poland.
