= Sucha Górna =

- Village
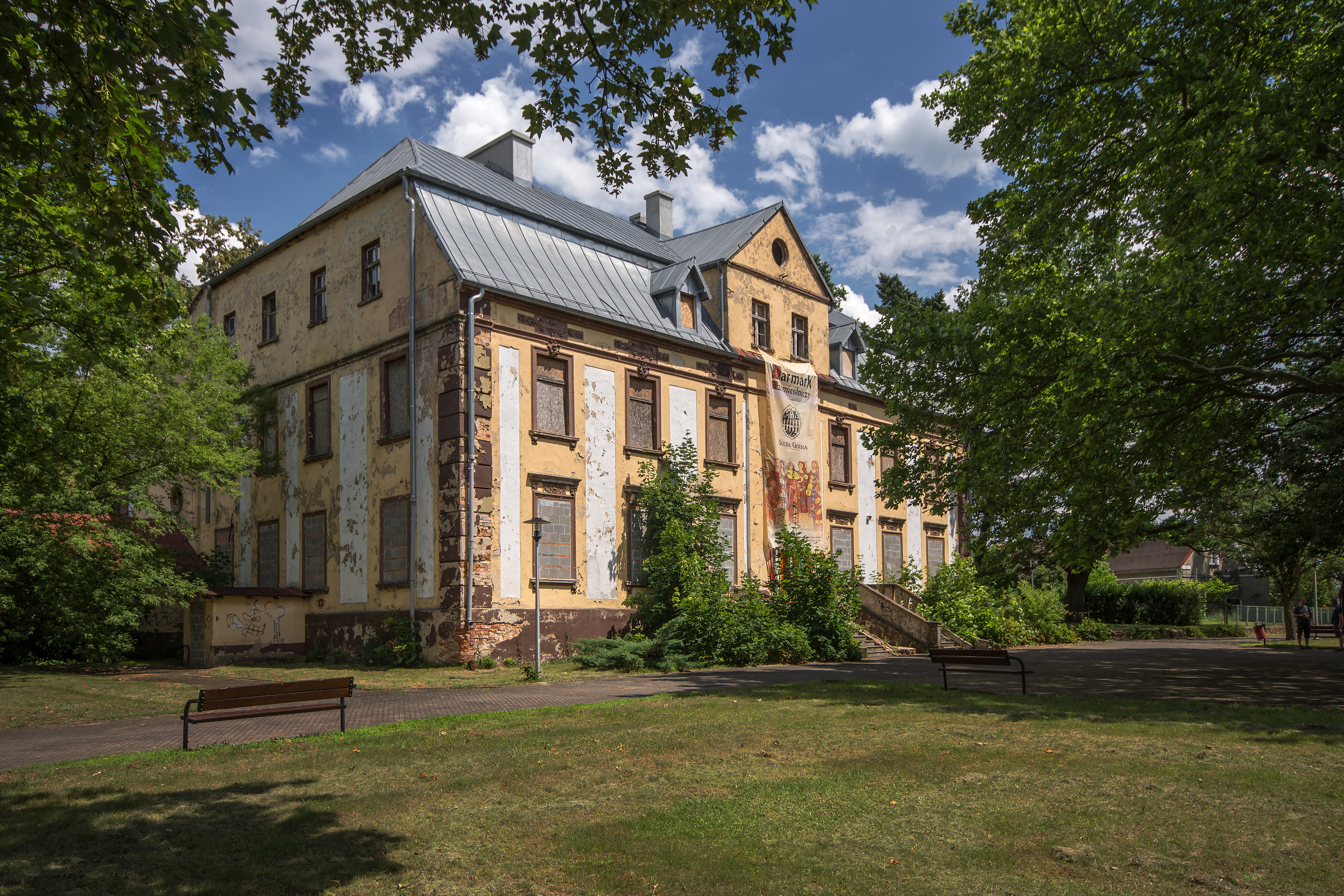
- Palace in Sucha Górna

- Location within Poland
- Coordinates: 51°32′21″N 16°01′22″E
- Country: Poland
- Voivodeship: Lower Silesian
- County: Polkowice
- Gmina: Polkowice
- Population: 460

Sucha Górna [ˈsuxa ˈɡurna] is a village in the administrative district of Gmina Polkowice, within Polkowice County, Lower Silesian Voivodeship, in south-western Poland.
