= Przesieczna =

- Village
- Location within Poland
- Coordinates: 51°35′10.96″N 15°57′54.55″E
- Country: Poland
- Voivodeship: Lower Silesian
- County: Polkowice
- Gmina: Radwanice

Przesieczna [pʂɛˈɕɛt͡ʂna] is a village in the administrative district of Gmina Radwanice, within Polkowice County, Lower Silesian Voivodeship, in south-western Poland.
