= Ulanow =

Ulanow may refer to the following places in Poland:

- Ulanów, a town in Subcarpathian Voivodeship, south-east Poland
- Ułanów, a village in Lower Silesian Voivodeship, south-west Poland
