= Buczyna, Lower Silesian Voivodeship =

Buczyna
- Village
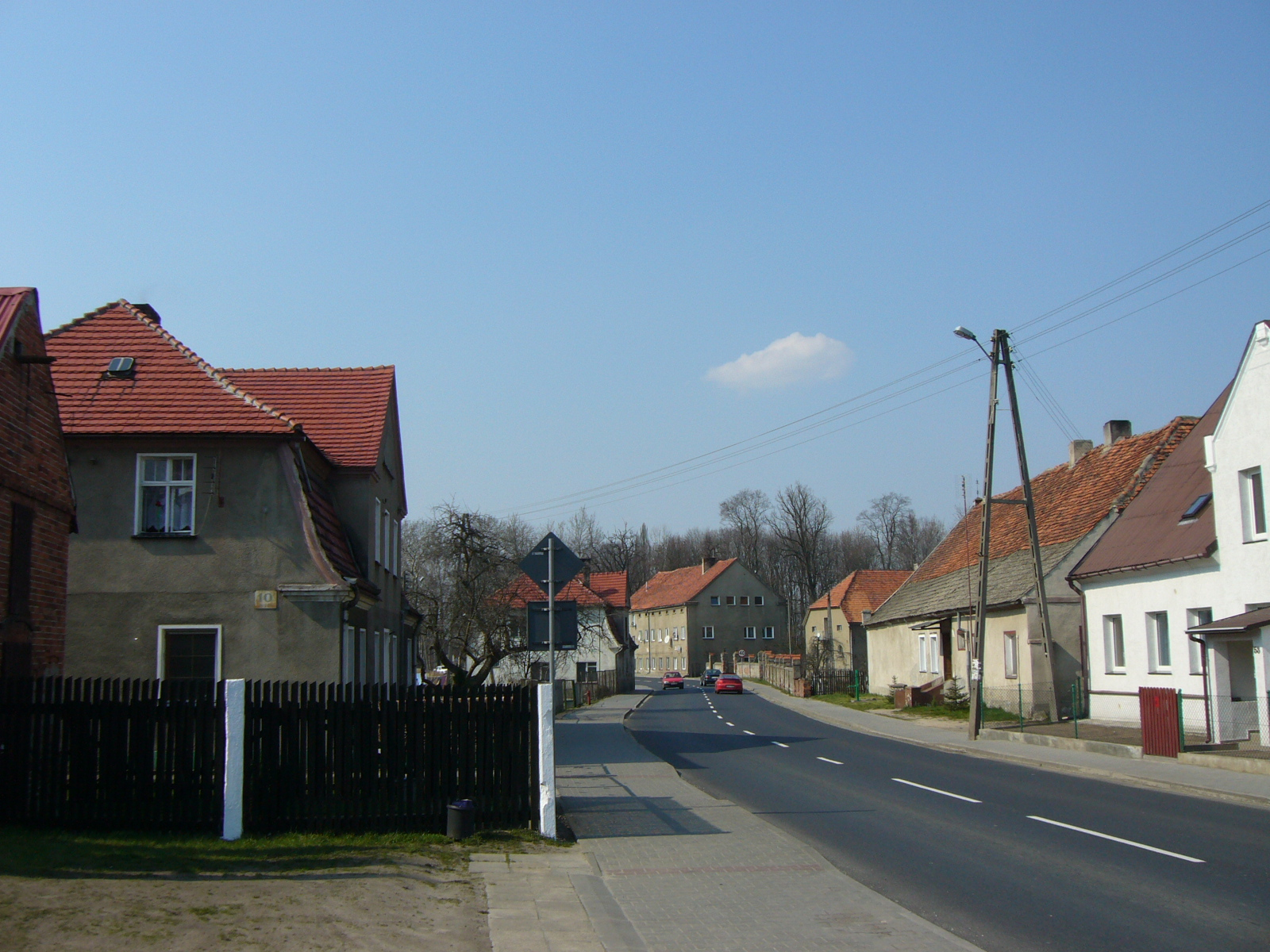

- Location within Poland
- Coordinates: 51°33′N 15°55′E
- Country: Poland
- Voivodeship: Lower Silesian
- County: Polkowice
- Gmina: Radwanice
- Population: 420

Buczyna [buˈt͡ʂɨna] is a village in the administrative district of Gmina Radwanice, within Polkowice County, Lower Silesian Voivodeship, in south-western Poland.

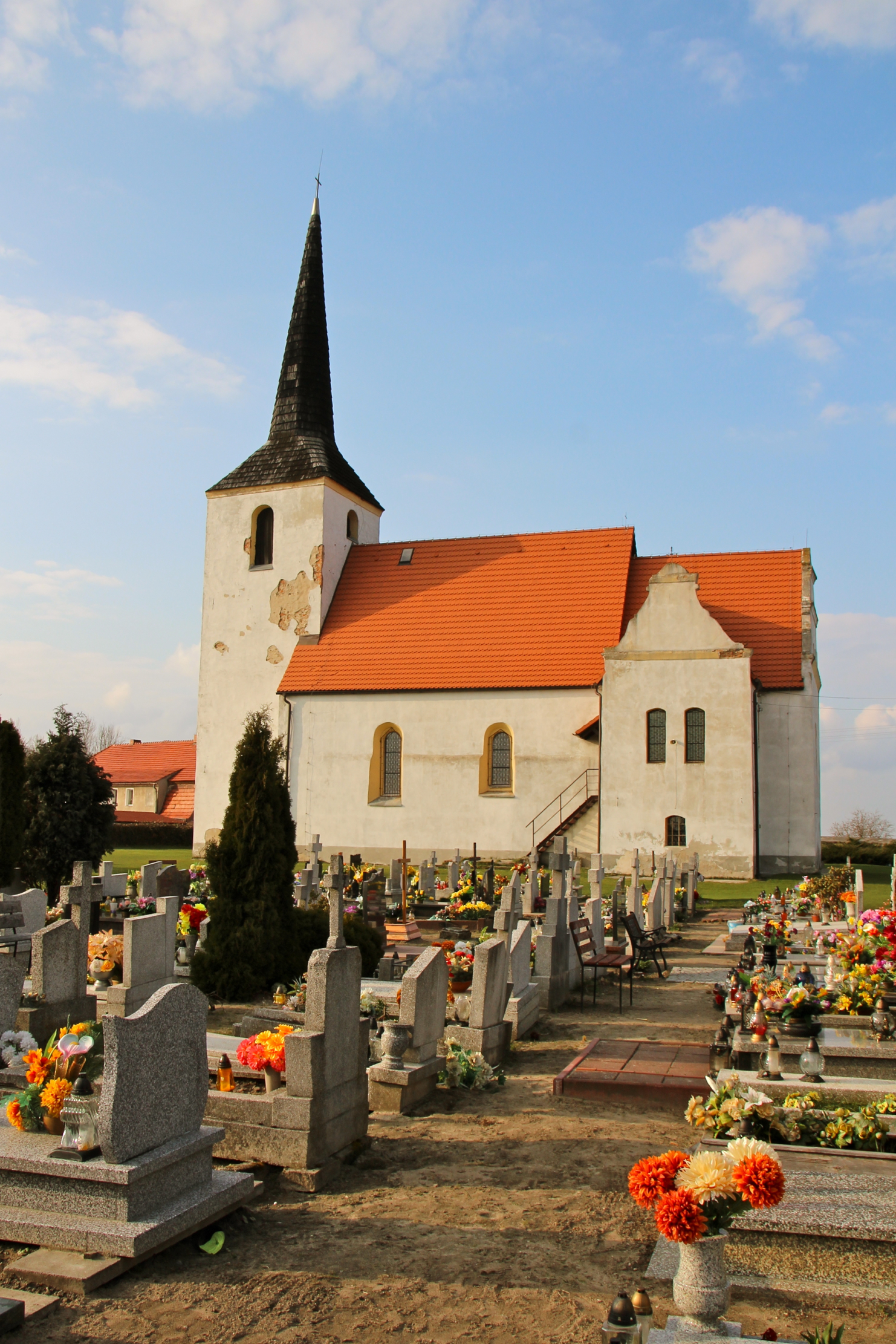
Church (2012)
