= Komorniki, Polkowice County =

Komorniki
- Village
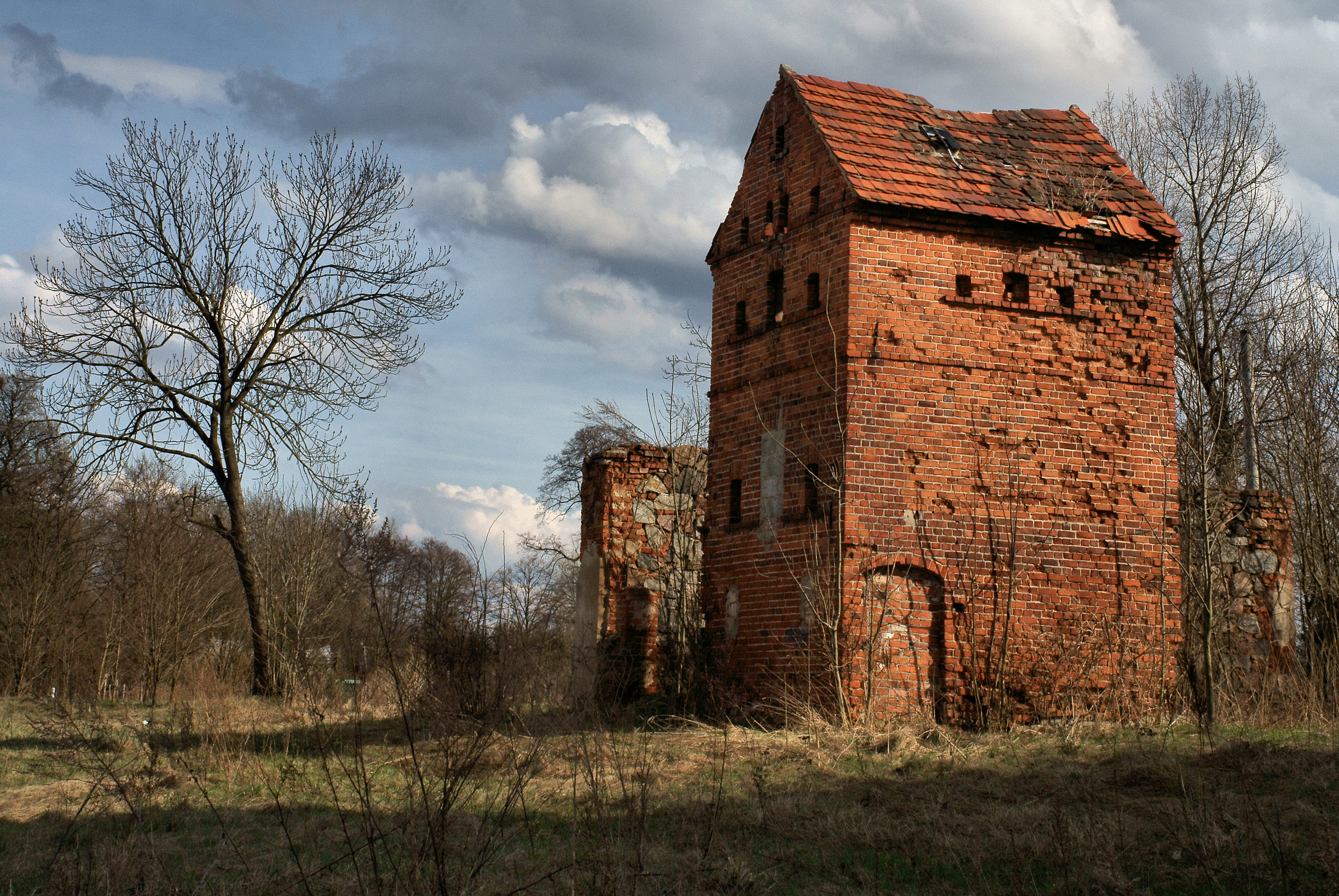
- Folwark complex in Komorniki

- Location within Poland
- Coordinates: 51°31′44″N 16°08′42″E
- Country: Poland
- Voivodeship: Lower Silesian
- County: Polkowice
- Gmina: Polkowice

Komorniki [kɔmɔrˈniki] is a village in the administrative district of Gmina Polkowice, within Polkowice County, Lower Silesian Voivodeship, in south-western Poland.
