= Żabice, Gmina Chocianów =

Żabice
- Village
- Location within Poland
- Coordinates: 51°21′54″N 16°01′20″E
- Country: Poland
- Voivodeship: Lower Silesian
- County: Polkowice
- Gmina: Chocianów
- Elevation: 350 m (1,150 ft)
- Population: 236

Żabice [ʐaˈbit͡sɛ] (German: Sabitz) is a village in the administrative district of Gmina Chocianów, within Polkowice County, Lower Silesian Voivodeship, in south-western Poland.
