= Moskorzyn, Lower Silesian Voivodeship =

Moskorzyn
- Village
- Location within Poland
- Coordinates: 51°32′34″N 16°05′07″E
- Country: Poland
- Voivodeship: Lower Silesian
- County: Polkowice
- Gmina: Polkowice
- Time zone: UTC+1 (CET)
  - Summer (DST): UTC+2 (CEST)
- Vehicle registration: DPL

Moskorzyn [mɔsˈkɔʐɨn] is a village in the administrative district of Gmina Polkowice, within Polkowice County, Lower Silesian Voivodeship, in south-western Poland.

The name of the village is of Polish origin and comes from the word mucha, which means "fly".
