= Gmina Polkowice =

Gmina Polkowice Polkowice Commune
- Gmina
- Flag Coat of arms
- Interactive map of Gmina Polkowice
- Coordinates (Polkowice): 51°30′N 16°04′E
- Country: Poland
- Voivodeship: Lower Silesian
- County: Polkowice
- Seat: Polkowice

Area
  - Total: 158.77 km^{2} (61.30 sq mi)

Population (2019-06-30)
  - Total: 27,676
  - Density: 174.32/km^{2} (451.47/sq mi)
  - Urban: 22,480
  - Rural: 5,196
- Website: http://www.polkowice.pl

Gmina Polkowice is an urban-rural gmina (administrative district) in Polkowice County, Lower Silesian Voivodeship, in south-western Poland. Its seat is the town of Polkowice, which lies approximately 80 kilometres (50 mi) north-west of the regional capital Wrocław.

The gmina covers an area of 158.77 square kilometres (61.3 sq mi), and as of 2019 its total population is 27,676.

== Neighbouring gminas ==
Gmina Polkowice is bordered by the gminas of Chocianów, Grębocice, Jerzmanowa, Lubin, Radwanice and Rudna.

== Villages ==
Apart from the town of Polkowice, the gmina contains the villages of Biedrzychowa, Dąbrowa, Guzice, Jędrzychów, Kaźmierzów, Komorniki, Moskorzyn, Nowa Wieś Lubińska, Pieszkowice, Polkowice Dolne, Sobin, Sucha Górna, Tarnówek, Trzebcz, Żelazny Most and Żuków.

== Twin towns – sister cities ==
Gmina Polkowice is twinned with:

- Sickte, Germany
