= Gmina Radwanice =

Gmina Radwanice Radwanice Commune
- Gmina
- Flag Coat of arms

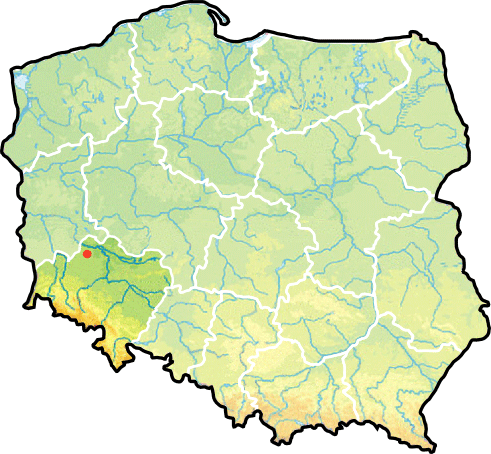
- Coordinates (Radwanice): 51°34′N 15°56′E
- Country: Poland
- Voivodeship: Lower Silesian
- County: Polkowice
- Seat: Radwanice
- Sołectwos: Buczyna, Drożów, Drożyna, Jakubów, Kłębanowice, Łagoszów Wielki, Lipin, Nowa Kuźnia, Nowy Dwór, Przesieczna, Radwanice, Sieroszowice, Strogoborzyce

Area
  - Total: 83.97 km^{2} (32.42 sq mi)

Population (2019-06-30)
  - Total: 4,810
  - Density: 57.3/km^{2} (148/sq mi)
- Website: https://www.radwanice.pl/

Gmina Radwanice is a rural gmina (administrative district) in Polkowice County, Lower Silesian Voivodeship, in south-western Poland. Its seat is the village of Radwanice, which lies approximately 12 kilometres (7 mi) north-west of Polkowice, and 92 kilometres (57 mi) north-west of the regional capital Wrocław.

The gmina covers an area of 83.97 square kilometres (32.4 sq mi), and as of 2019 its total population is 4,810.

== Neighbouring gminas ==
Gmina Radwanice is bordered by the gminas of Chocianów, Gaworzyce, Jerzmanowa, Polkowice, Przemków and Żukowice.

== Villages ==
The gmina contains the villages of Borów, Buczyna, Dobromil, Drożów, Drożyna, Jakubów, Kłębanowice, Łagoszów Wielki, Lipin, Nowa Kuźnia, Nowy Dwór, Przesieczna, Radwanice, Sieroszowice, Strogoborzyce, Teodorów and Ułanów.
