= Ułanów =

- Village
- Location within Poland
- Coordinates: 51°30′52″N 15°57′06″E
- Country: Poland
- Voivodeship: Lower Silesian
- County: Polkowice
- Gmina: Radwanice

Ułanów [uˈwanuf] (German: Greif) is a village in the administrative district of Gmina Radwanice, within Polkowice County, Lower Silesian Voivodeship, in south-western Poland.
