= Parchów =

- Village
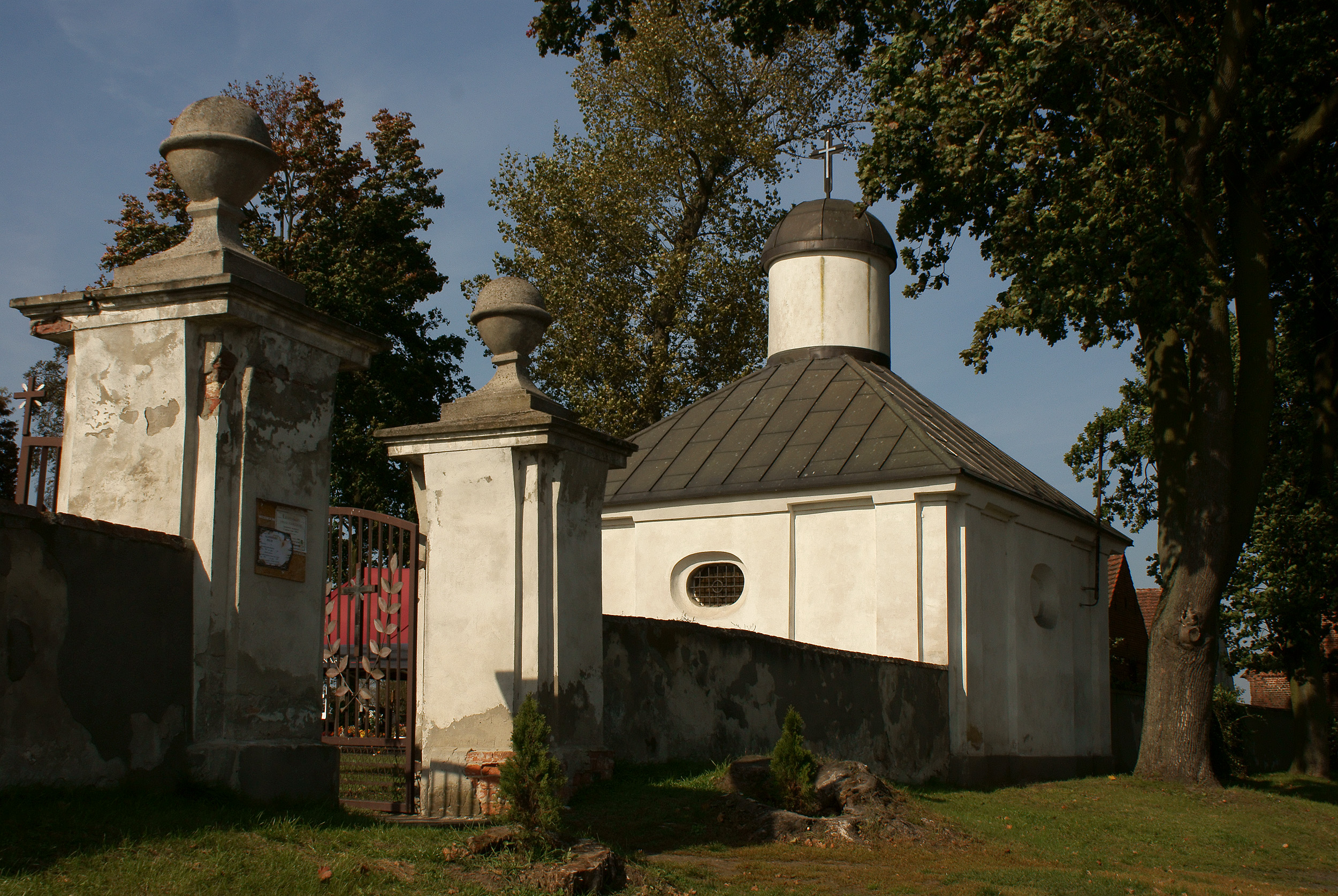
- Cemetery chapel in Parchów

- Location within Poland
- Coordinates: 51°29′N 15°57′E
- Country: Poland
- Voivodeship: Lower Silesian
- County: Polkowice
- Gmina: Chocianów
- Time zone: UTC+1 (CET)
  - Summer (DST): UTC+2 (CEST)

Parchów [ˈparxuf] is a village in the administrative district of Gmina Chocianów, within Polkowice County, Lower Silesian Voivodeship, in south-western Poland.
