= Radwanice, Polkowice County =

Radwanice
- Village
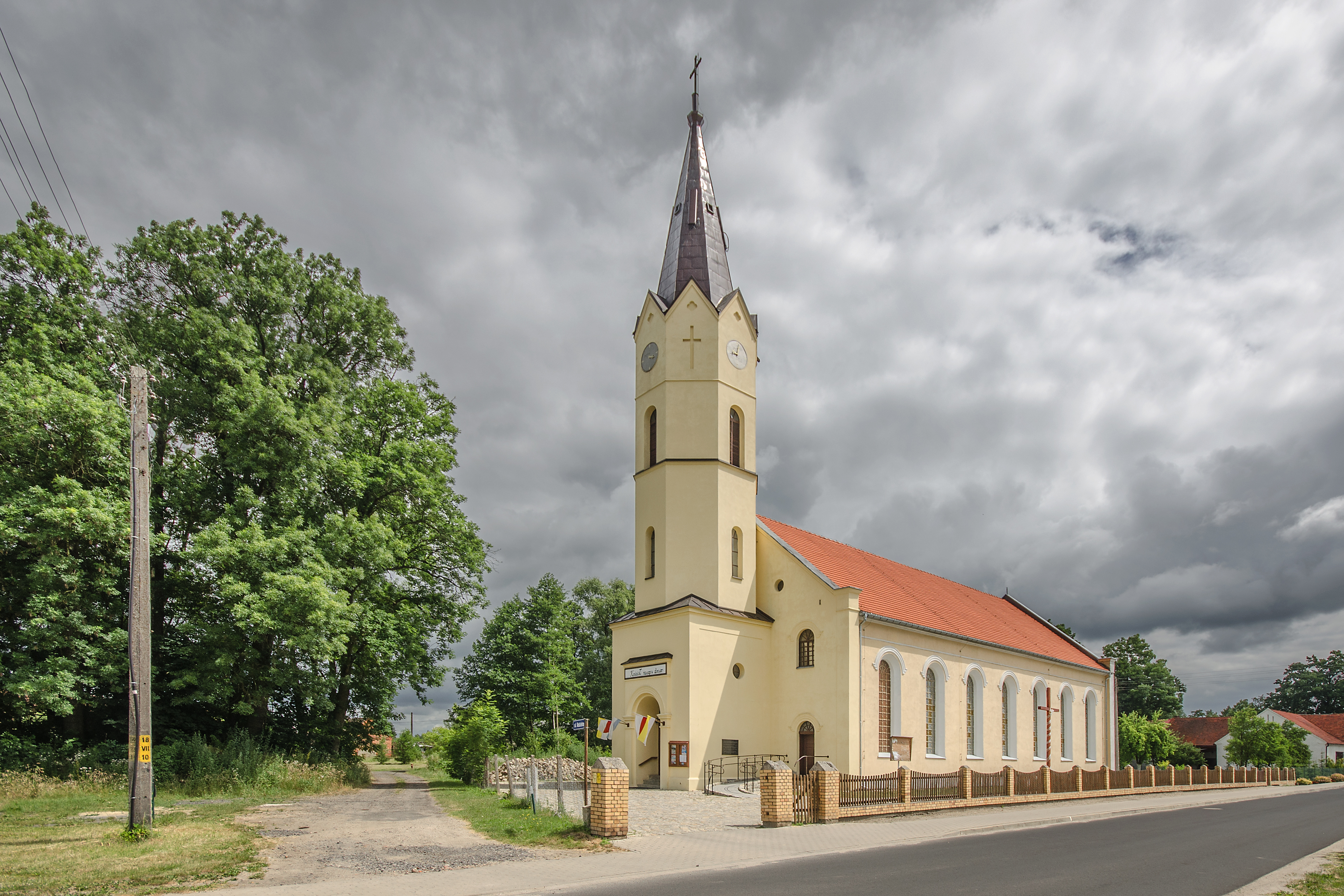
- Catholic church

- Location within Poland
- Coordinates: 51°34′N 15°56′E
- Country: Poland
- Voivodeship: Lower Silesian
- County: Polkowice
- Gmina: Radwanice
- Population: 2,100
- Website: http://www.radwanice.sisco.pl

Radwanice [radvaˈnit͡sɛ] (German: Wiesau) is a village in Polkowice County, Lower Silesian Voivodeship, in south-western Poland. It is the seat of the administrative district (gmina) called Gmina Radwanice.
