= Żelazny Most, Lower Silesian Voivodeship =

Żelazny Most
- Village
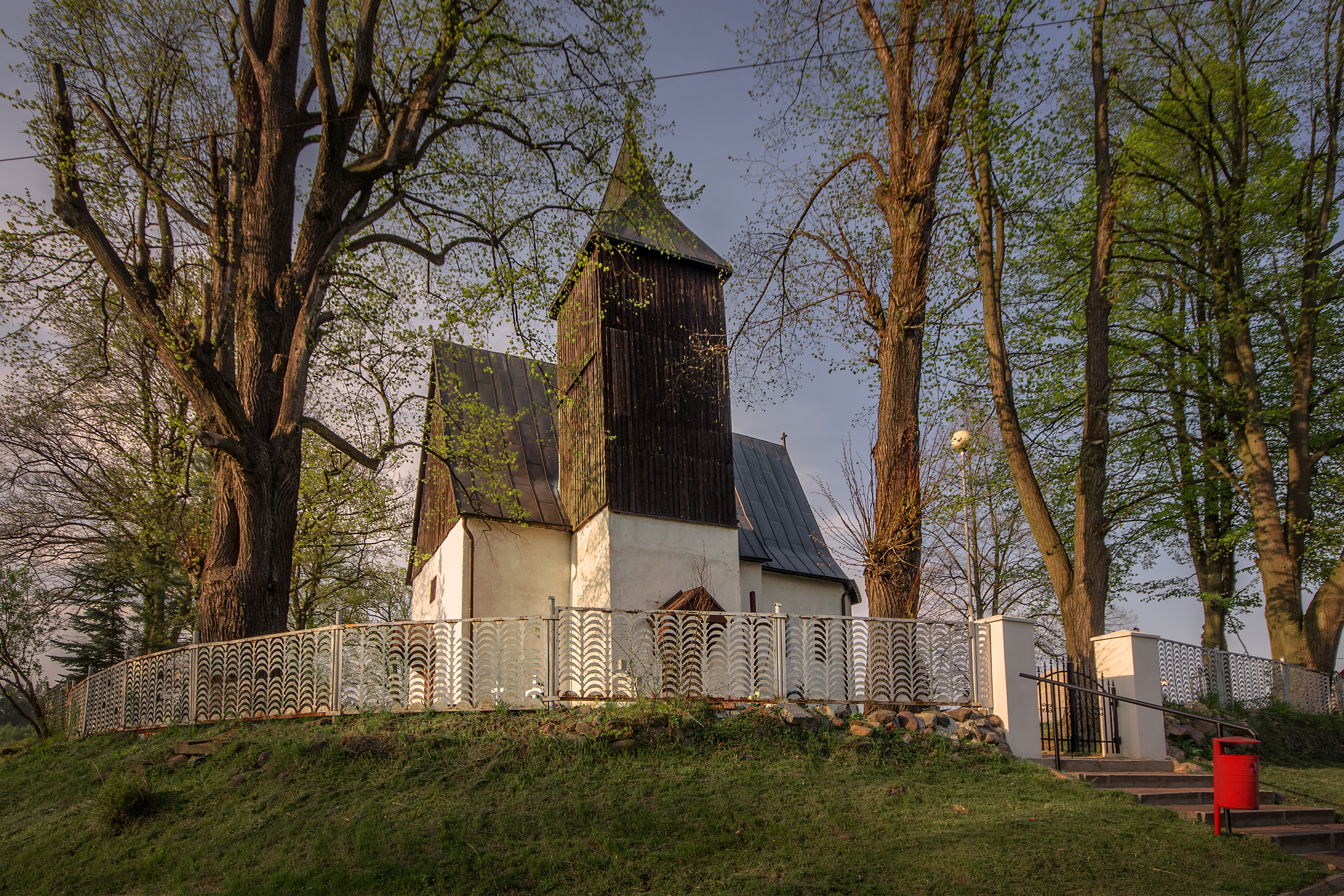
- Saint Barbara Church

- Location within Poland
- Coordinates: 51°28′39″N 16°10′16″E
- Country: Poland
- Voivodeship: Lower Silesian
- County: Polkowice
- Gmina: Polkowice
- Population: 180

Żelazny Most [ʐɛˈlaznɨ ˈmɔst] ("iron bridge") (German: Eisemost) is a village in the administrative district of Gmina Polkowice, within Polkowice County, Lower Silesian Voivodeship, in south-western Poland.

Satellite photos of Żelazny Most show a circular body of water within a 2 km (1 mi) radius. It is a flotation wastes depository, storing trailings from three adjacent copper mines.
