= Jaroslaw Trochanowski =

- Known for: Lemkovyna Song and Dance Company
- Relatives: brother Petro Trochanowski

Jaroslaw Trochanowski is a Lemko composer and musician. He founded the Lemkovyna Song and Dance Company.

== Honors ==
- Constantine Ostrogski Award
