= Sieroszowice =

- Village
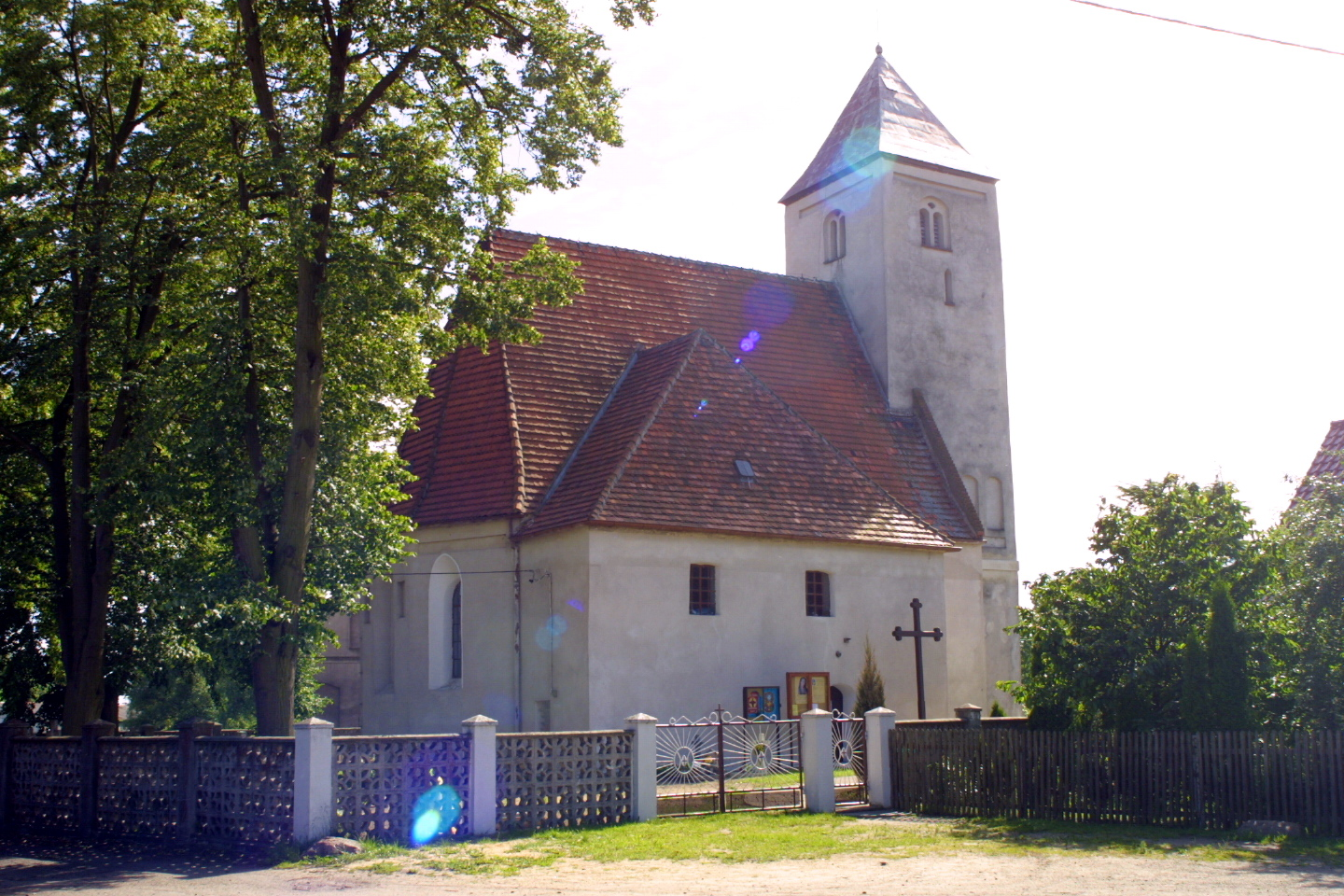
- Saints Peter and Paul Church

- Location within Poland
- Coordinates: 51°31′44″N 15°56′56″E
- Country: Poland
- Voivodeship: Lower Silesian
- County: Polkowice
- Gmina: Radwanice
- Population: 420

Sieroszowice [ɕɛrɔʂɔˈvit͡sɛ] is a village in the administrative district of Gmina Radwanice, within Polkowice County, Lower Silesian Voivodeship, in south-western Poland.

The village's German name probably derives from the name of a Lokator who brought German farmers to the village.
