= Gmina Chocianów =

Gmina Chocianów Chocianów Commune
- Gmina
- Flag Coat of arms
- Interactive map of Gmina Chocianów
- Coordinates (Chocianów): 51°25′N 15°55′E
- Country: Poland
- Voivodeship: Lower Silesian
- County: Polkowice
- Seat: Chocianów

Area
  - Total: 230.27 km^{2} (88.91 sq mi)

Population (2019-06-30)
  - Total: 12,778
  - Density: 55.491/km^{2} (143.72/sq mi)
  - Urban: 7,892
  - Rural: 4,886
- Website: http://www.chocianow.pl/

Gmina Chocianów is an urban-rural gmina (administrative district) in Polkowice County, Lower Silesian Voivodeship, in south-western Poland. Its seat is the town of Chocianów, which lies approximately 14 kilometres (9 mi) south-west of Polkowice, and 85 kilometres (53 mi) west of the regional capital Wrocław.

The gmina covers an area of 230.27 square kilometres (88.9 sq mi), and as of 2019 its total population is 12,778.

== Neighbouring gminas ==
Gmina Chocianów is bordered by the gminas of Chojnów, Gromadka, Lubin, Polkowice, Przemków and Radwanice.

== Villages ==
Apart from the town of Chocianów, the gmina contains the villages of Brunów, Chocianowiec, Duninów, Jabłonów, Michałów, Ogrodzisko, Parchów, Pogorzeliska, Raków, Szklary Dolne, Trzebnice, Trzmielów and Żabice.
