= Ivan Ulanov =

Russian theater and film actor (1932–2025)

Ivan Ulanov

Ivan Alekseevich Ulanov (Russian: Иван Алексеевич Уланов; 4 November 1932 – 21 July 2025) was a Russian theater and film actor of Kalmyk origin.

== Life and career ==
Ulanov was born 4 November 1932 in the Iki-Burulsky District, Kalmyk ASSR. In 1943, at the age of 11, he was deported with his family to Siberia as part of the NKVD special operation "Uluses". He spent his childhood and youth in exile.

In 1963 he graduated with honors from the Leningrad Institute of Theater, Music and Cinematography (LGITMiK) and was accepted into the troupe of the Kalmyk State Drama Theater. For 62 years, he played more than 200 roles in performances based on plays of domestic, foreign and national drama.

In 1970 he was awarded an Honored Artist of the RSFSR, and the People's Artist of the Kalmyk Autonomous Soviet Socialist Republic in 1986.

In 2019, Ulanov was awarded the Golden Mask Award for his outstanding contribution to the development of theatrical art.

Ulanov died on 21 July 2025, at the age of 92.
