= Vladimir Ulanov (writer) =

Russian writer and journalist (born 1946)

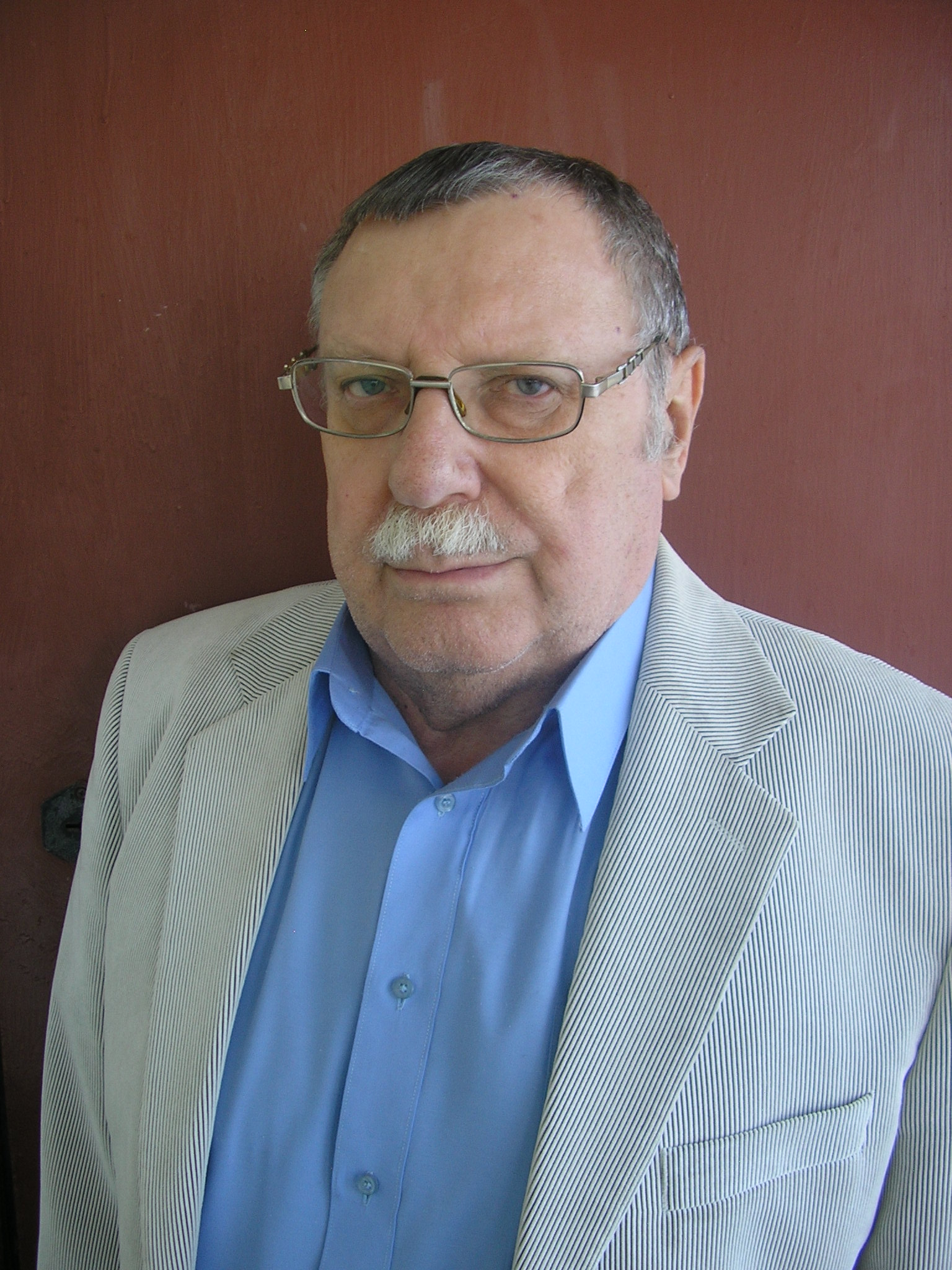
- Born: Владимир Иванович Уланов; 1 November 1946; Razvedka, Altai Krai, USSR
- Occupations: Writer, journalist
- Website: uviya.ru

Vladimir Ivanovich Ulanov (Russian: Владимир Иванович Уланов; born 1 November 1946, in Altai Krai, USSR) is a Russian writer, journalist, member of the Russian Union of Writers, IFRW and International Union of Writers.

Was a chairman of the Board of Arkhangelsk "Regional Union of Writers Povazhe". Ulanov nominated for literary prizes "Heritage 2015" (for novel "Princely cross", " Writer of the Year 2013 ". Winner of two awards "Golden Pen of Russia", "Historical Heritage" in 2010 and "funny sign" in 2007. Nominated in the name of Sergey Yesenin Literary Prize "My Russia". Nominated for the award "Writer of year 2016".

Have 51 publications of books of Vladimir Ulanov.

== Biography ==
In 1976 Ulanov began to publish articles in local newspapers and national magazines in Novokuznetsk.

In 1983 he worked in Dushanbe (Tajikistan) with the newspapers "Communist of Tajikistan", "Teacher", "Evening Dushanbe", "Komsomolets of Tajikistan." Prints his works in national magazines "Soviet School", "Pioneer", "Counselor," "School and Production", "Food", "worker". He started writing the novel "Riot".

In 1986 Ulanov published his first book "Billboards and information on vocational guidance to students working trades".

Afterwards Ulanov moved to the Russian city Velsk to work with the newspapers "Velsk-Info", "Velskie vesti", "Velskaya Week".

In 2002 he published his novel "Riot" (in 2 parts). In 2006, the novels "Temptation" and "Purification of time" were published and in 2008, his novel "Prince's cross".

15 November 2007 Vladimir Ulanov created "Regional Union of Writers Povazhe" in Velsk. Start work almanac "Povazhe".

In 2008 Vladimir Ulanov became a member of the Russian Union of Writers.

In 2016 Ulanov start publishing his books on the Internet.

In 2018 Ulanov received a number of awards: the Cyril and Methodius Medal, the Medal for good work in culture and art, Medal for the high contribution to the development of Russian literature and the education of patriotism in the younger generation and Russian literary prize.

== Books ==
Collected Works in 6 volumes:

- "Riot" (1 part). ISBN 978-5-91960-013-8.
- "Riot" (2 part). ISBN 978-5-91960-009-1.
- "Temptation". ISBN 978-5-91960-007-7.
- "Princely cross". ISBN 978-5-91960-006-0.
- "The Tragedy of Tsar Boris". ISBN 978-5-91960-017-6.
- "Mystery of Sirius". ISBN 978-5-91960-012-1.

== Publications ==
- Golden stanza of 2009 #1. P. 254.
- National Literary Award. Writer of the year 2013. Book 18. Moscow 2014. P. 261.
- Heritage 2015. Book of the fifteenth. Moscow 2015. P. 49.
- National literary prize "Writer of the Year" Fiction 2016. Moscow 2017. P. 153.
- Russian bell. Number 4. Moscow, 2017. P. 153.
- The Russian bell "Autumn kiss" Moscow, 2017. P. 163.
- Literary Award. Prose. Heritage 2017. Book one. Moscow. 2017. P. 97.
- Literary Prize named after Sergei Yesenin "My Russia". Book four. Moscow, 2017. P. 226
- Russian bell "Oh, what a woman ..." Moscow 2017. P. 220
- Russian bell. Issue number 1.Moscow, 2017. P. 173.
- Literary Prize named after Sergei Yesenin "My Russia". Book 3. Moscow, 2017. P. 55.
- Inheritance. Literary Prize 2015 Book fifteenth. Moscow 2015. P. 49
- Russian bell. Special edition of the "Immortal regiment." Moscow, 2018. P. 237.
- Russian bell. Special edition "Nominees of the Russian Literary Prize - 2018. "#2. Moscow 2018. P. 208-287.

== Links ==
- Official website of Vladimir Ulanov
