= Żelazny Most (lake) =

Żelazny Most Reservoir
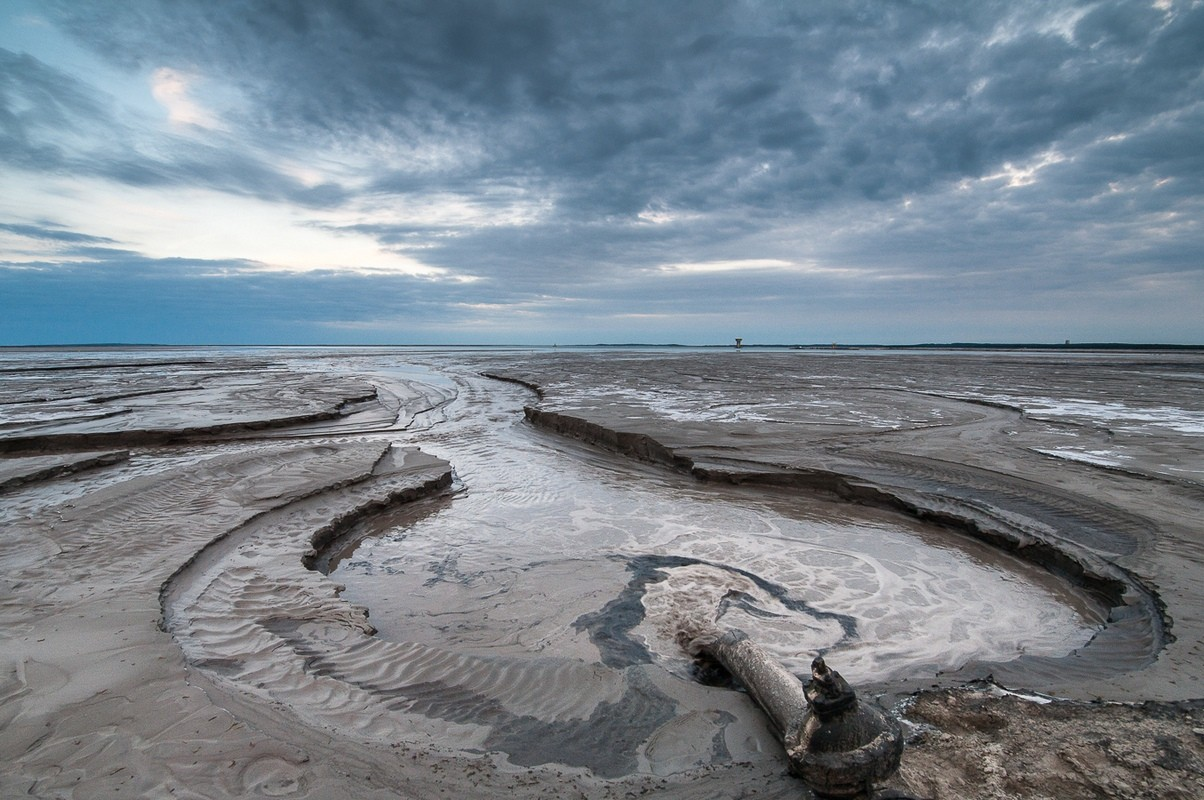
- Żelazny Most Reservoir

- Location within Poland
- Coordinates: 51°31′12″N 16°12′00″E
- Type: reservoir
- Basin countries: Poland
- Max. length: 2.2 km (1.4 mi)
- Max. width: 1.4 km (0.87 mi)
- Surface area: 13.9 km^{2} (5.4 sq mi)
- Average depth: 2.5 m (8.2 ft)
- Max. depth: 2.5 m (8.2 ft)
- Water volume: 8,000,000 m^{3} (6,500 acre⋅ft)
- Surface elevation: 0.1 m (0.33 ft)

Żelazny Most Reservoir is the largest sump reservoir of froth (copper mining tailings dam) in Europe, owned by KGHM Polska Miedź.

The name of the reservoir comes from the nearby village of Żelazny Most, located 3.4 kilometres south-west of the reservoir; with the village of Rudna to the east of the reservoir.

The reservoir's construction began in 1974, and exploitation (and the completion of the reservoir's construction) on February 12, 1977. The construction of the reservoir included the destruction of the villages of Barszów, Kalinówka, and Pielgrzymów. Previously, the sump was stored in the Gilów Reservoir, which was closed after the new reservoir was put into operation.

The site is the largest tailings dam in Europe, which was further expanded in 2021.
