= Polkowice County =

Coordinates: 51°50′N 16°05′E

Polkowice County Powiat polkowicki
- County
- Flag Coat of arms

- Location within the voivodeship

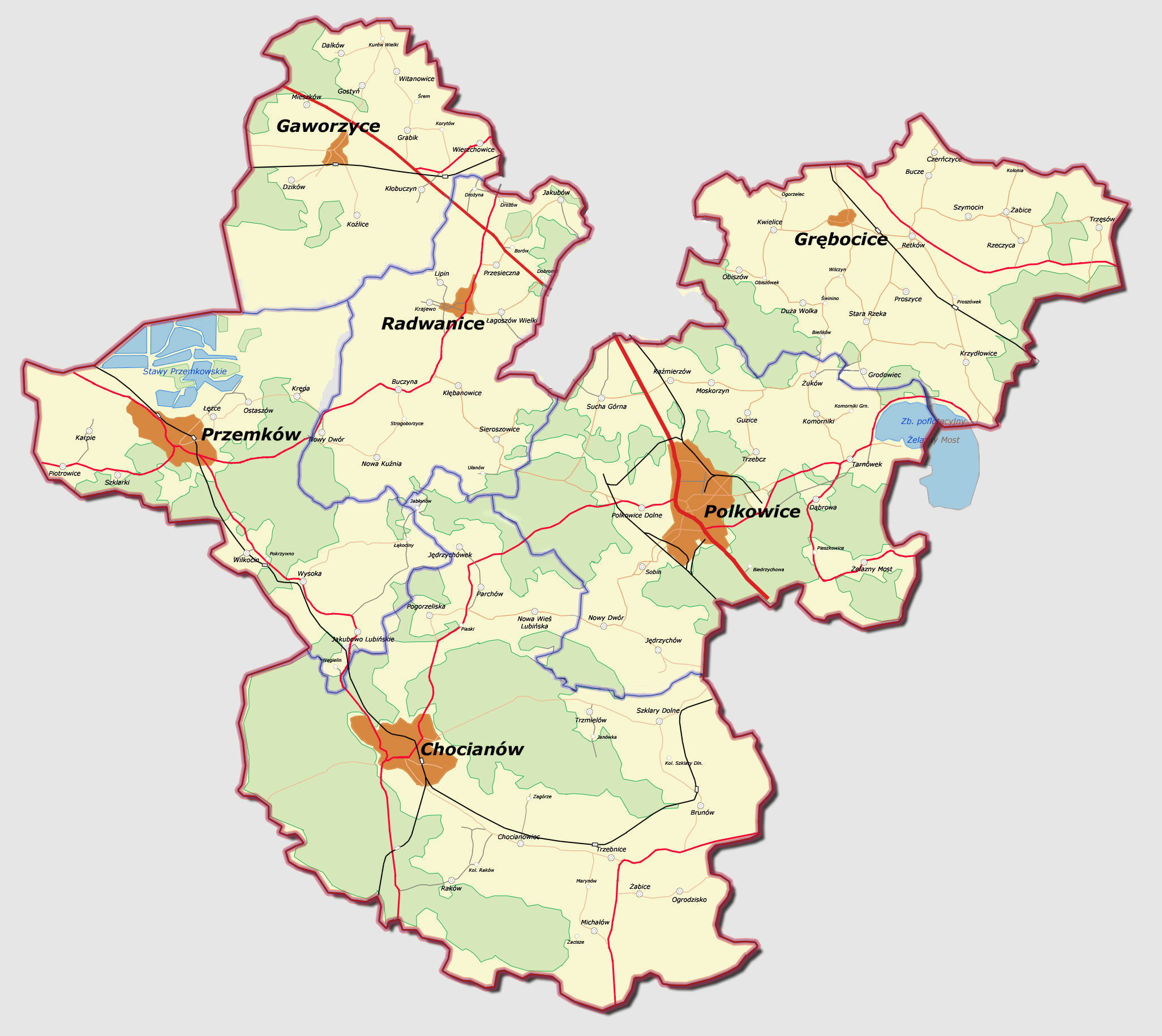
- Map of the county
- Country: Poland
- Voivodeship: Lower Silesian
- Seat: Polkowice
- Gminas: Total 6: Gmina Chocianów; Gmina Gaworzyce; Gmina Grębocice; Gmina Polkowice; Gmina Przemków; Gmina Radwanice

Area
  - Total: 779.93 km^{2} (301.13 sq mi)

Population (2019-06-30)
  - Total: 62,948
  - Density: 80.710/km^{2} (209.04/sq mi)
  - Urban: 36,479
  - Rural: 26,469
- Car plates: DPL
- Website: www.powiatpolkowicki.pl

Polkowice County (Polish: powiat polkowicki) is a unit of territorial administration and local government (powiat) in Lower Silesian Voivodeship, south-western Poland. It came into being on January 1, 1999, as a result of the Polish local government reforms passed in 1998. The county covers an area of 779.9 square kilometres (301.1 sq mi). Its administrative seat is the town of Polkowice, and it also contains the towns of Chocianów and Przemków.

As of 2019 the total population of the county is 62,948, out of which the population of Polkowice is 22,480, that of Chocianów is 7,892, that of Przemków is 6,107, and the rural population is 26,469.

== Neighbouring counties ==
Polkowice County is bordered by Głogów County to the north, Lubin County to the south-east, Legnica County to the south, Bolesławiec County to the south-west and Żagań County to the west.

== Administrative divisions ==
The county is subdivided into six gminas (three urban-rural and three rural). These are listed in the following table, in descending order of population.

Gmina	Type	Area (km^{2})	Population (2019)	Seat
Gmina Polkowice	urban-rural	158.8	27,676	Polkowice
Gmina Chocianów	urban-rural	230.3	12,778	Chocianów
Gmina Przemków	urban-rural	108.0	8,329	Przemków
Gmina Grębocice	rural	121.9	5,358	Grębocice
Gmina Radwanice	rural	84.0	4,810	Radwanice
Gmina Gaworzyce	rural	77.0	3,997	Gaworzyce
