= List of mines in Poland =

This list of mines in Poland is subsidiary to the list of mines article and lists working, defunct and future mines in the country and is organised by the primary mineral output. For practical purposes stone, marble and other quarries may be included in this list.

== Coal ==
- Adamów Coal Mine
- Bełchatów Coal Mine
- Bielszowice Coal Mine
- Bogdanka Coal Mine
- Bolesław Śmiały Coal Mine
- Borynia Coal Mine
- Budryk Coal Mine
- Chwałowice Coal Mine
- Drzewce Coal Mine
- Dęby Szlacheckie Coal Mine
- Gubin Coal Mine
- Halemba Coal Mine
- Janina Coal Mine
- Jankowice Coal Mine
- Jas-Mos Coal Mine
- Jóźwin Coal Mine
- Konin Coal Mine
- Krupiński Coal Mine
- Legnica Coal Mine
- Matylda Coal Mine (Liquidated)
- Mosty Coal Mine
- Murcki Coal Mine
- Mysłowice-Wesoła Coal Mine
- Piaski Coal Mine
- Piast Coal Mine
- Pniówek Coal Mine
- Sobieski Coal Mine
- Sośnica-Makoszowy Coal Mine
- Staszic Coal Mine
- Szczygłowice Coal Mine
- Szombierki Coal Mine (Liquidated)
- Tomisławice Coal Mine
- Trzcianka Coal Mine
- Turów Coal Mine
- Wujek Coal Mine
- Ziemowit Coal Mine
- Zofiówka Coal Mine

== Copper ==
- Bytom Odrzański mine
- Gaworzyce mine
- Głogów Głęboki-Przemysłowy mine
- Lubin mine
- Myszków mine
- Polkowice-Sieroszowice mine
- Retków mine

== Limestone ==
- Kujawy mine

== Nickel ==
- Szklary mine

== Salt ==
- Bochnia Salt Mine
- Wieliczka Salt Mine
