= Ogorzelec =

Ogorzelec may refer to the following places in Poland:

- Ogorzelec, Kamienna Góra County in Gmina Kamienna Góra, Kamienna Góra County in Lower Silesian Voivodeship (SW Poland)
- Ogorzelec, Polkowice County in Gmina Grębocice, Polkowice County in Lower Silesian Voivodeship (SW Poland)
