= Stara Rzeka, Lower Silesian Voivodeship =

Stara Rzeka
- Village
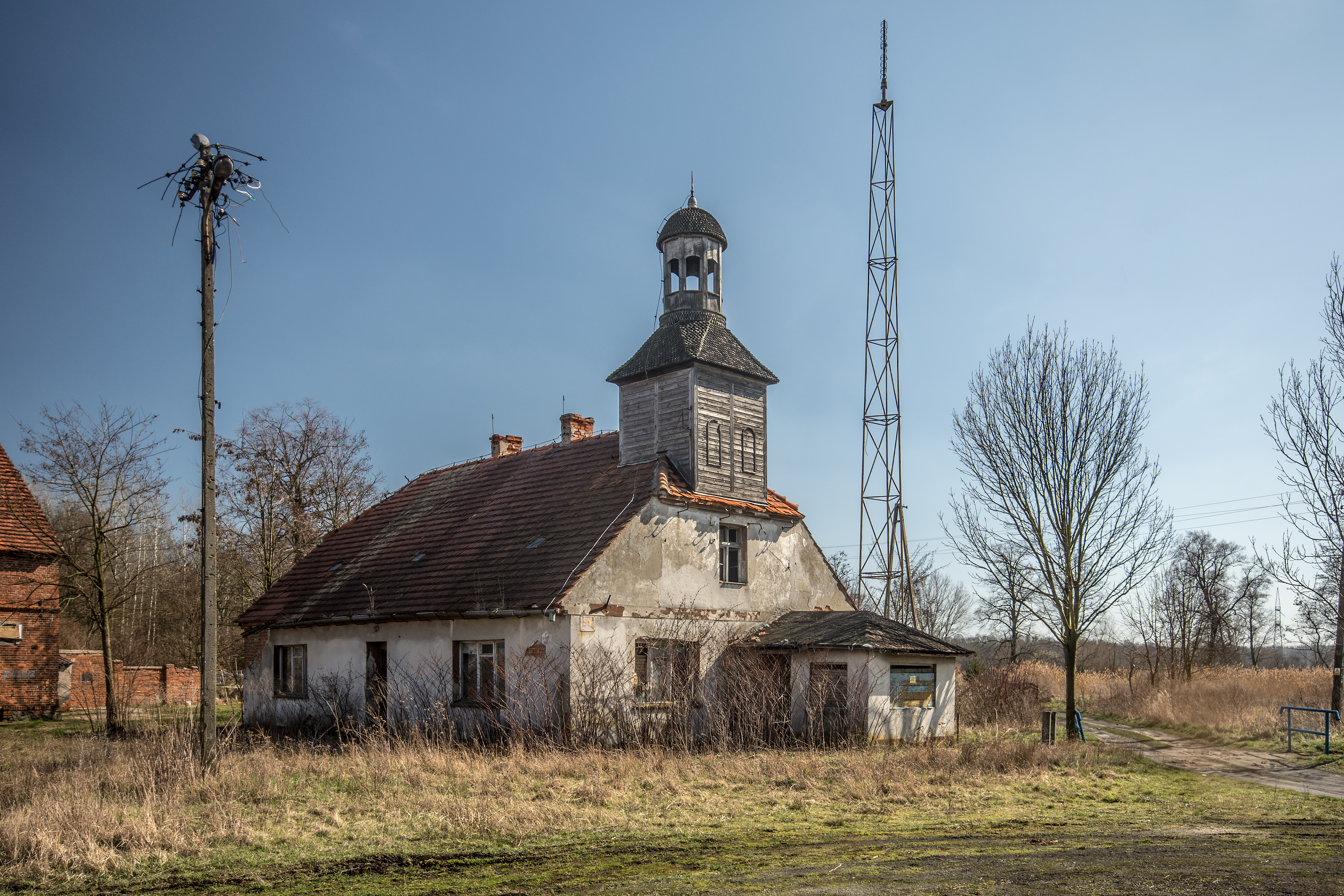
- Manor outbuilding

- Location within Poland
- Coordinates: 51°34′N 16°10′E
- Country: Poland
- Voivodeship: Lower Silesian
- County: Polkowice
- Gmina: Grębocice

Stara Rzeka [ˈstara ˈʐɛka] (German: Altwasser) is a village in the administrative district of Gmina Grębocice, within Polkowice County, Lower Silesian Voivodeship, in south-western Poland.
