= Grębocice =

- Village
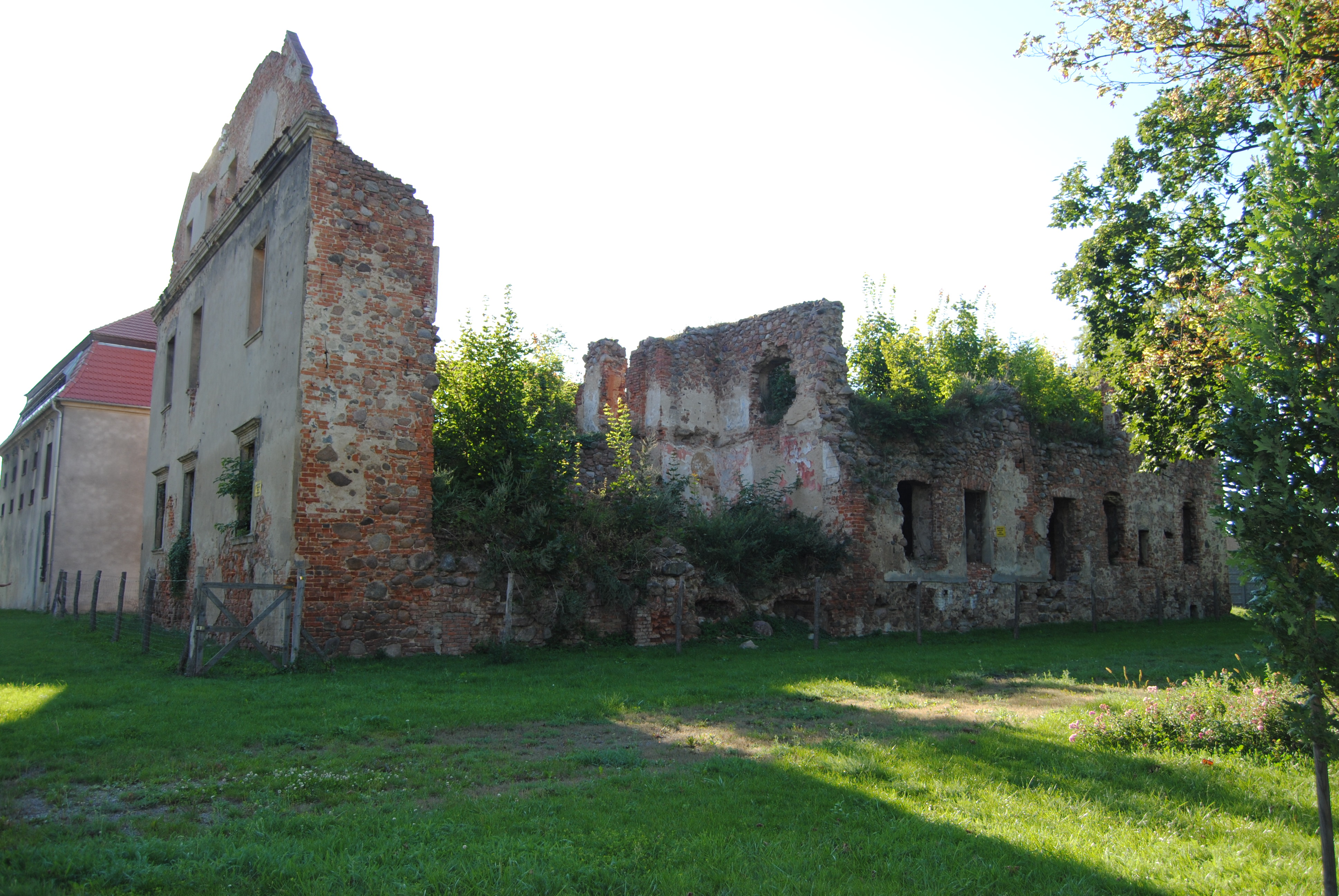
- Former palace

- Location within Poland
- Coordinates: 51°35′53″N 16°09′57″E
- Country: Poland
- Voivodeship: Lower Silesian
- County: Polkowice
- Gmina: Grębocice
- Elevation: 87 m (285 ft)
- Population: 1,500

Grębocice [ɡrɛmbɔˈt͡ɕit͡sɛ] (German: Gramschütz) is a village in Polkowice County, Lower Silesian Voivodeship, in south-western Poland. It is the seat of the administrative district (gmina) called Gmina Grębocice.
