= Bucze, Lower Silesian Voivodeship =

Bucze
- Village
- Location within Poland
- Coordinates: 51°36′44″N 16°12′56″E
- Country: Poland
- Voivodeship: Lower Silesian
- County: Polkowice
- Gmina: Grębocice

Bucze [ˈbut͡ʂɛ] (German: Bautsch) is a village in the administrative district of Gmina Grębocice, within Polkowice County, Lower Silesian Voivodeship, in south-western Poland.
