= Tomisławice Coal Mine =

Coal mine in Poland

Tomisławice coal mine
- Location: Tomisławice, Greater Poland Voivodeship, Poland
- Products: Coal
- Production: 2,600,000
- Opened: 2011
- Company: Kopalnia Wegla Brunatnego Tomisławice

The Tomisławice coal mine is a large mine in the centre of Poland in Tomisławice, Greater Poland Voivodeship, 167 km west of the capital, Warsaw. Tomisławice represents one of the largest coal reserve in Poland having estimated reserves of 41 million tonnes of coal. The annual coal production is around 2.6 million tonnes.

According to many scientists, the Tomisławice coal mine is an extreme threat to the neighbouring nature protection Natura 2000 areas, including the protected Gopło lake. Its opening in May 2010 has resulted in many protests of local self-governments, farmers and ecological organisations.
