= Proszyce =

- Village
- Location within Poland
- Coordinates: 51°34′06″N 16°12′02″E
- Country: Poland
- Voivodeship: Lower Silesian
- County: Polkowice
- Gmina: Grębocice

Proszyce [prɔˈʂɨt͡sɛ] (German: Porschütz) is a village in the administrative district of Gmina Grębocice, within Polkowice County, Lower Silesian Voivodeship, in south-western Poland.
