= Dęby Szlacheckie Coal Deposit =

Coal mine in Poland

Dęby Szlacheckie coal deposit
- Location: Dęby Szlacheckie, Greater Poland Voivodeship, Poland
- Products: Lignite
- Production: none
- Company: PAK KWB Konin

The Dęby Szlacheckie coal deposit is a lignite deposit in the north of Poland in Dęby Szlacheckie, Greater Poland Voivodeship, 130 km north-west of the capital, Warsaw. The Dęby Szlacheckie deposit has estimated reserves of 92 million tonnes of coal.

The Association of Brown Coal Producers in Poland has identified the deposit as a possible source of fuel for power plants.

In 2015 a local referendum in Gmina Babiak opposed PAK KWB Konin's proposed open-pit mining of the deposit. In 2020, PAK KWB Konin, a subsidiary of the polish utility company ZE PAK, decided to not develop the Dęby Szlacheckie lignite deposit.
