= Wirek =

- Ruda Śląska District
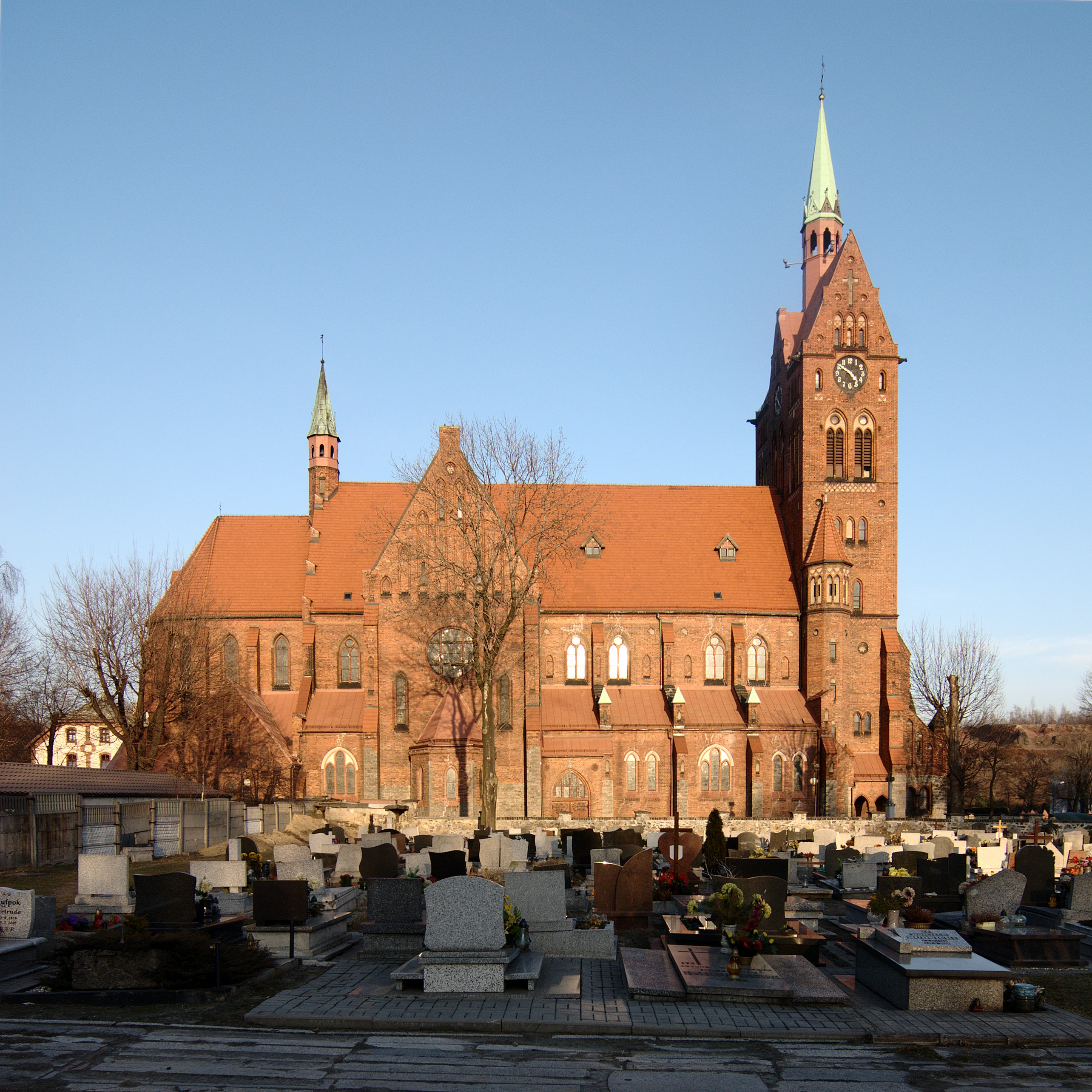
- Saint Lawrence church

- Location of Wirek within Ruda Śląska
- Coordinates: 50°16′28″N 18°51′52″E
- Country: Poland
- Voivodeship: Silesian
- County/City: Ruda Śląska
- Time zone: UTC+1 (CET)
  - Summer (DST): UTC+2 (CEST)
- Area code: (+48) 032

Wirek (German: Antonienhütte) is a district in the centre of Ruda Śląska, Silesian Voivodeship, southern Poland. In 2006 it had an area of 5.9 km^{2} and was inhabited by 20,595 people. On January 12, 2006 a part of it was split off to form a new district, Czarny Las.

== History ==
Originally, the area belonged to Kochłowice. First a settlement called Nowa Wieś (lit. New Village) was established. Wirek would later be developed around Antonienhütte ironworks, opened in 1805, and became a separate municipality in 1828. In the second half of the nineteenth century, the settlement grew owing to industrial development. A school was opened in 1856; a Roman Catholic church in 1874; and a year later, a rail connection with Chebzie was constructed. The municipality lost its independence in 1870.

In 1921, Wirek became part of Polish Autonomous Silesian Voivodeship. In 1924 Nowa Wieś again absorbed Wirek. A town hall was built in years 1929–1930. During World War II, it was occupied by Germany. In 1948 Nowa Wieś was renamed to Wirek.

Wirek was merged into Nowy Bytom in 1951, and as part of Nowy Bytom was amalgamated with Ruda to form Ruda Śląska on December 31, 1958.

== Notable residents ==
- Franz Machon

== Gallery ==
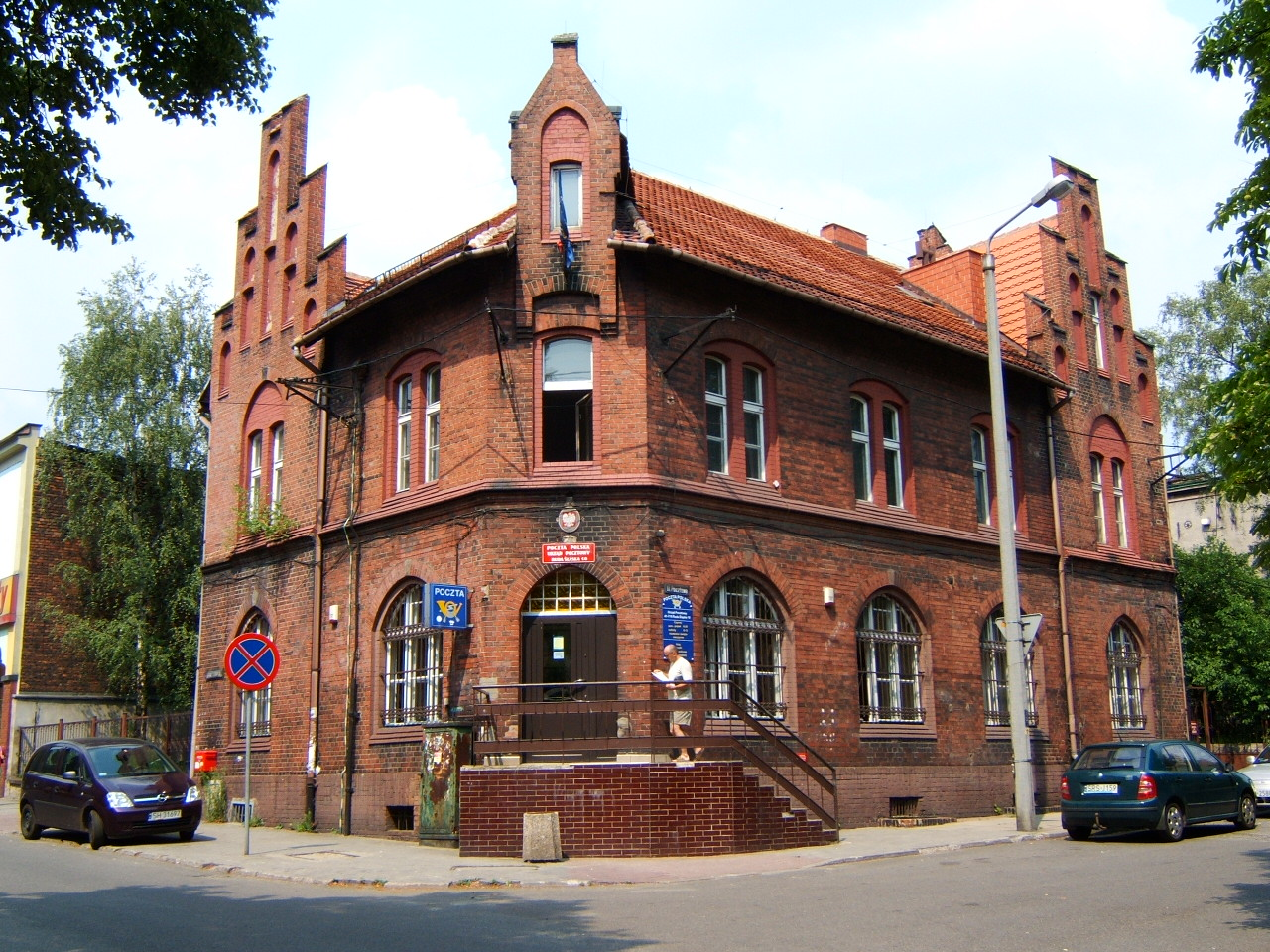
Mail office

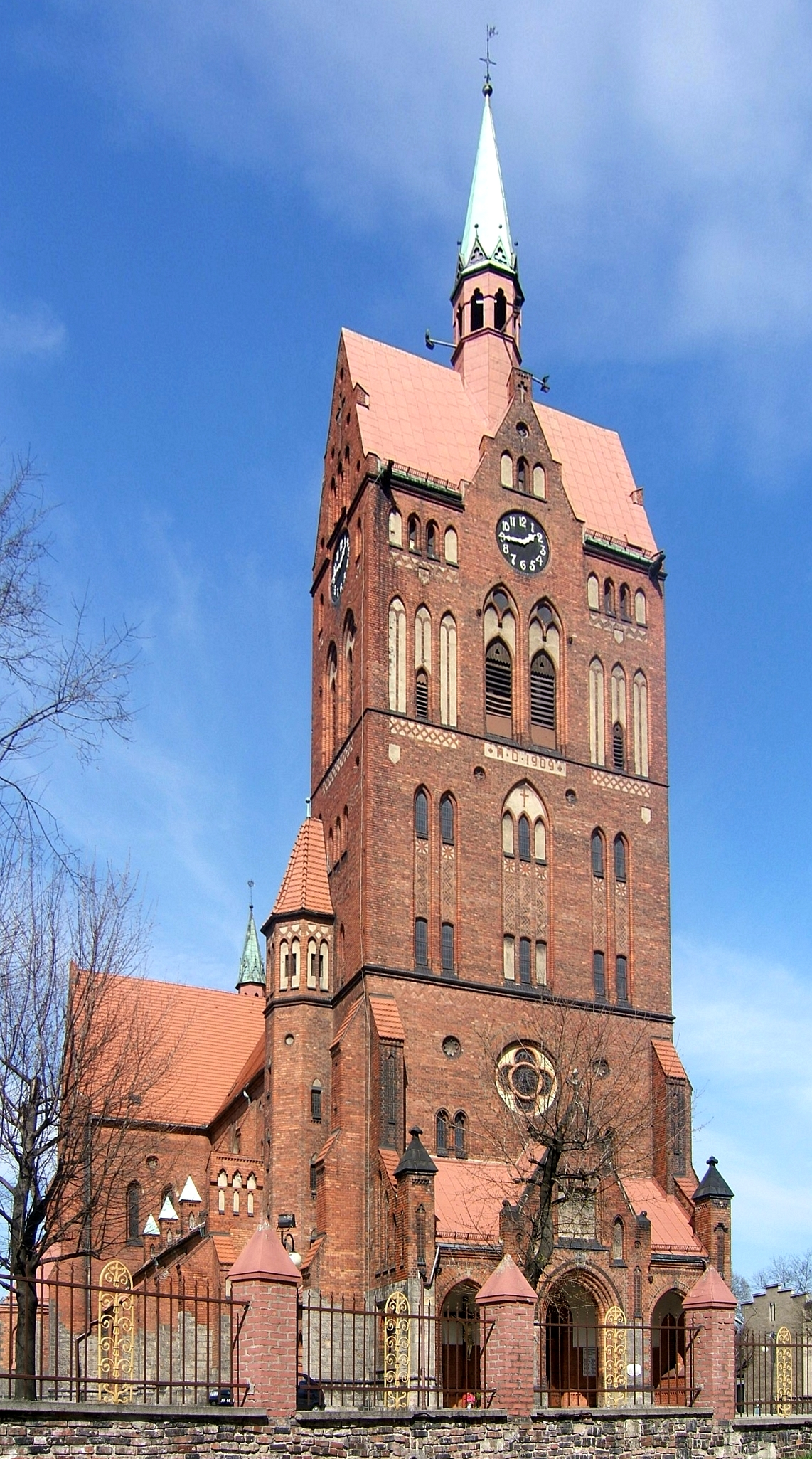
Saint Lawrence church

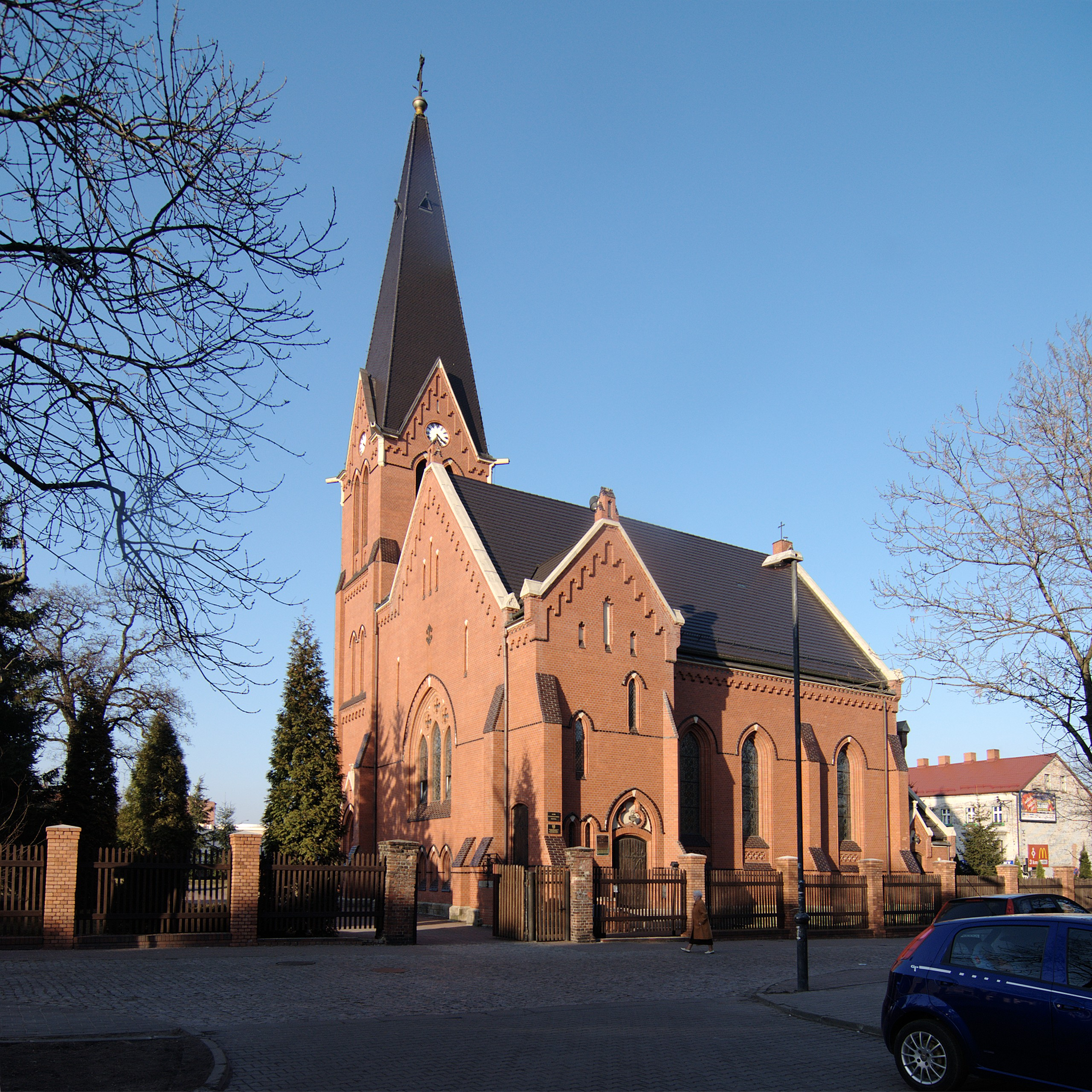
Lutheran church

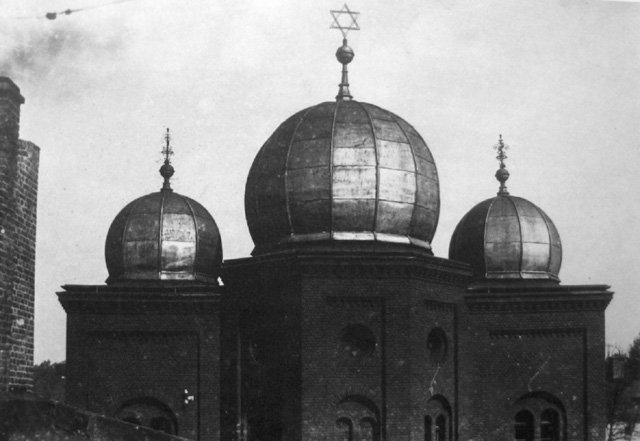
Synagogue, destroyed in 1939
