= Żabice, Gmina Grębocice =

Żabice
- Village
- Location within Poland
- Coordinates: 51°35′49″N 16°15′25″E
- Country: Poland
- Voivodeship: Lower Silesian
- County: Polkowice
- Gmina: Grębocice

Żabice [ʐaˈbit͡sɛ] is a village in the administrative district of Gmina Grębocice, within Polkowice County, Lower Silesian Voivodeship, in south-western Poland.
