= Krzydłowice =

- Village
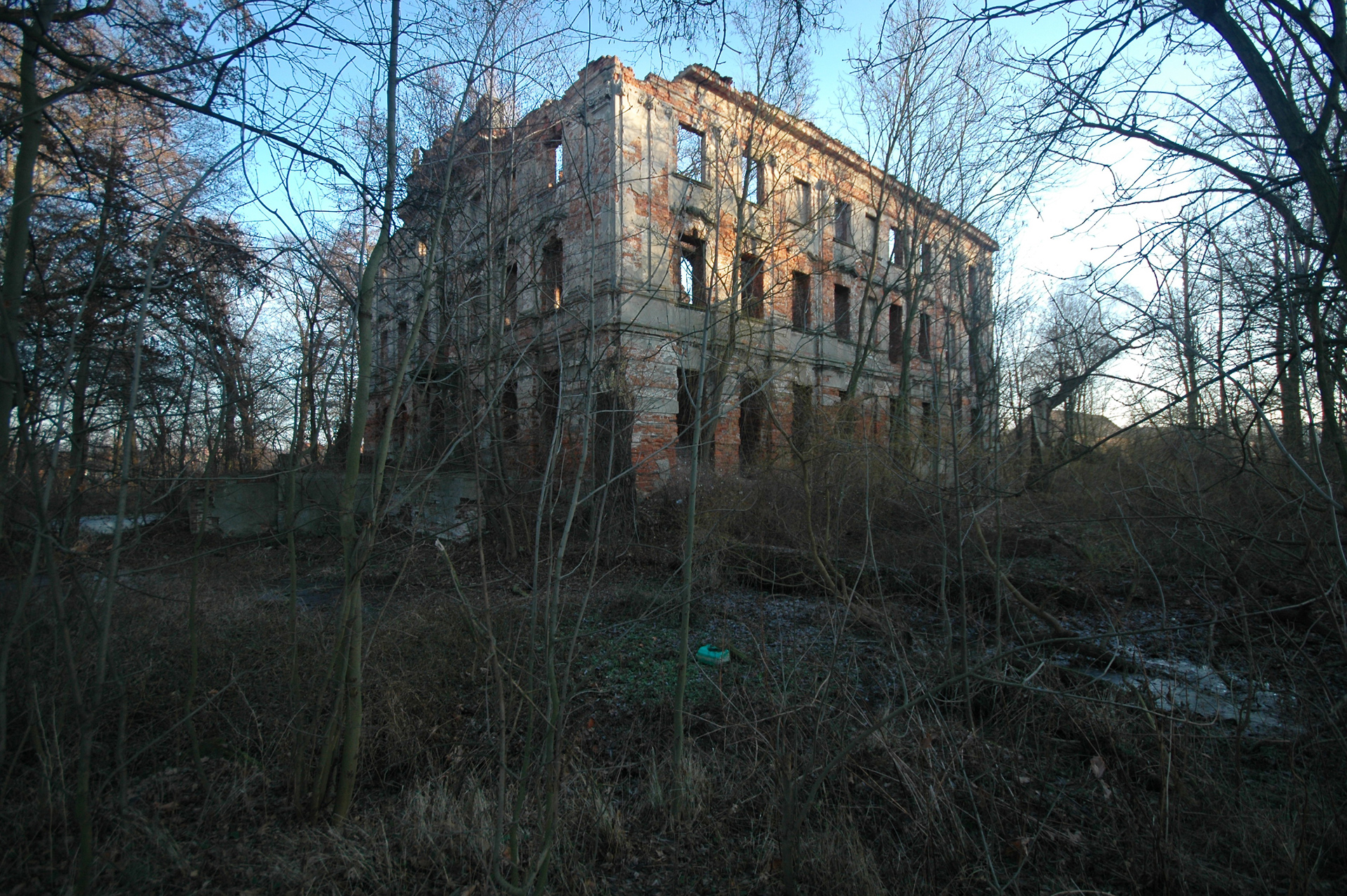
- Abandoned manor in Krzydłowice

- Location within Poland
- Coordinates: 51°32′43″N 16°13′55″E
- Country: Poland
- Voivodeship: Lower Silesian
- County: Polkowice
- Gmina: Grębocice
- Time zone: UTC+1 (CET)
  - Summer (DST): UTC+2 (CEST)
- Vehicle registration: DPL

Krzydłowice [kʂɨdwɔˈvit͡sɛ] (German: Kreidelwitz) is a village in the administrative district of Gmina Grębocice, within Polkowice County, Lower Silesian Voivodeship, in south-western Poland.
