= Jóźwin Coal Mine =

Coal mine in Jóźwin, Greater Poland Voivodeship, Poland

Jóźwin coal mine
- Location within Poland
- Location: Jóźwin, Greater Poland Voivodeship, Poland; 52°24′59.57″N 18°9′45.96″E
- Products: Coal
- Production: 3,300,000
- Opened: Jóźwin - 1971; Jóźwin IIB - 1999
- Company: PAK KWB Konin

The Jóźwin coal mine is a large mine in the west of Poland in Jóźwin, Greater Poland Voivodeship, 150 km west of the capital, Warsaw. The Jóźwin deposit has estimated reserves of 96.3 million tonnes of coal. The annual coal production is around 3.3 million tonnes.
