= Duża Wólka =

Village in Poland

- Village
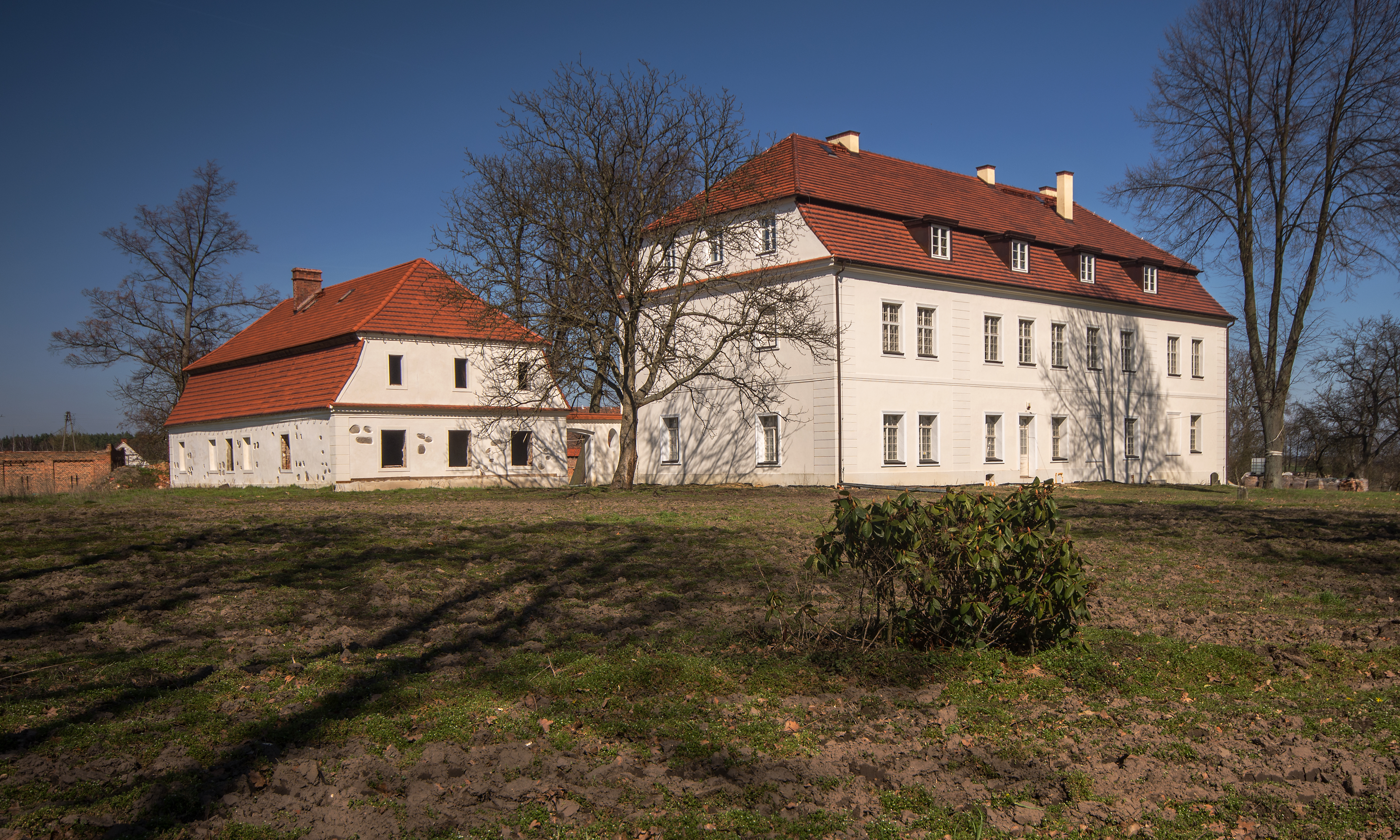
- Palace

- Location within Poland
- Coordinates: 51°34′09″N 16°08′07″E
- Country: Poland
- Voivodeship: Lower Silesian
- County: Polkowice
- Gmina: Grębocice

Duża Wólka [ˈduʐa ˈvulka] (German: Groß Schwein) is a village in the administrative district of Gmina Grębocice, within Polkowice County, Lower Silesian Voivodeship, in south-western Poland.

== Notable residents ==
- Martha Remmert (1853–1941), German classical pianist, music educator, conductor and music writer
