= Mosty Coal Mine =

Coal mine in Poland

Mosty coal mine
- Location: Mosty, Łódź Voivodeship, Poland
- Products: Coal
- Production: 3,500,000
- Opened: 1955
- Company: Kopalnia Wegla Brunatnego Mosty

The Mosty coal mine is a large mine in the centre of Poland in Mosty, Łódź Voivodeship, 150 km west of the capital, Warsaw. Mosty represents one of the largest coal reserves in Poland, having estimated reserves of 175.4 million tonnes of coal. The annual coal production is around 3.5 million tonnes.
