= Grodziszcze, Polkowice County =

Grodziszcze
- Village
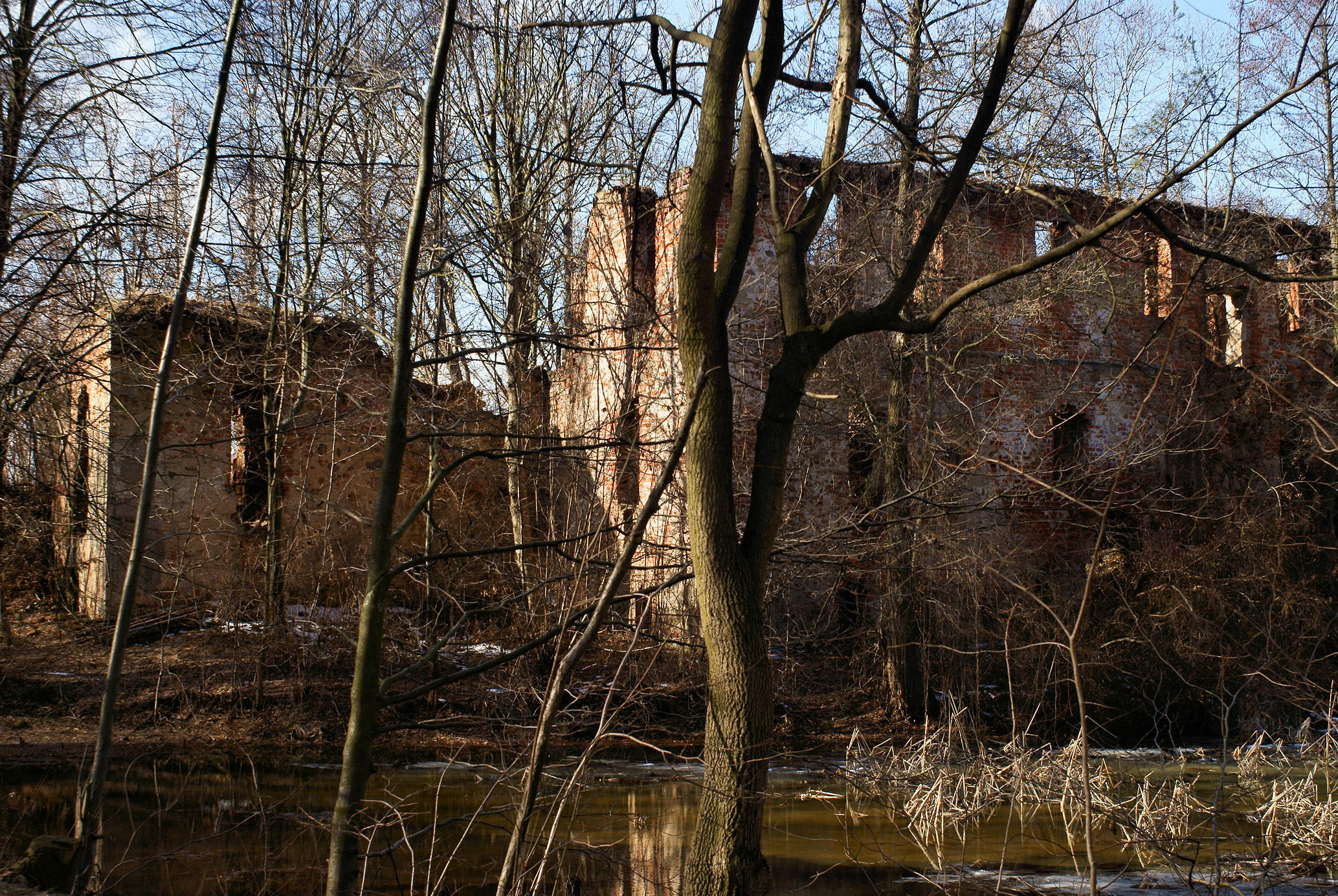
- Palace ruins

- Location within Poland
- Coordinates: 51°33′11″N 16°12′35″E
- Country: Poland
- Voivodeship: Lower Silesian
- County: Polkowice
- Gmina: Grębocice

Grodziszcze [ɡrɔˈd͡ʑiʂt͡ʂɛ] (German: Groß Gräditz) is a village in the administrative district of Gmina Grębocice, within Polkowice County, Lower Silesian Voivodeship, in south-western Poland.
