= Rzeczyca, Polkowice County =

Rzeczyca
- Village
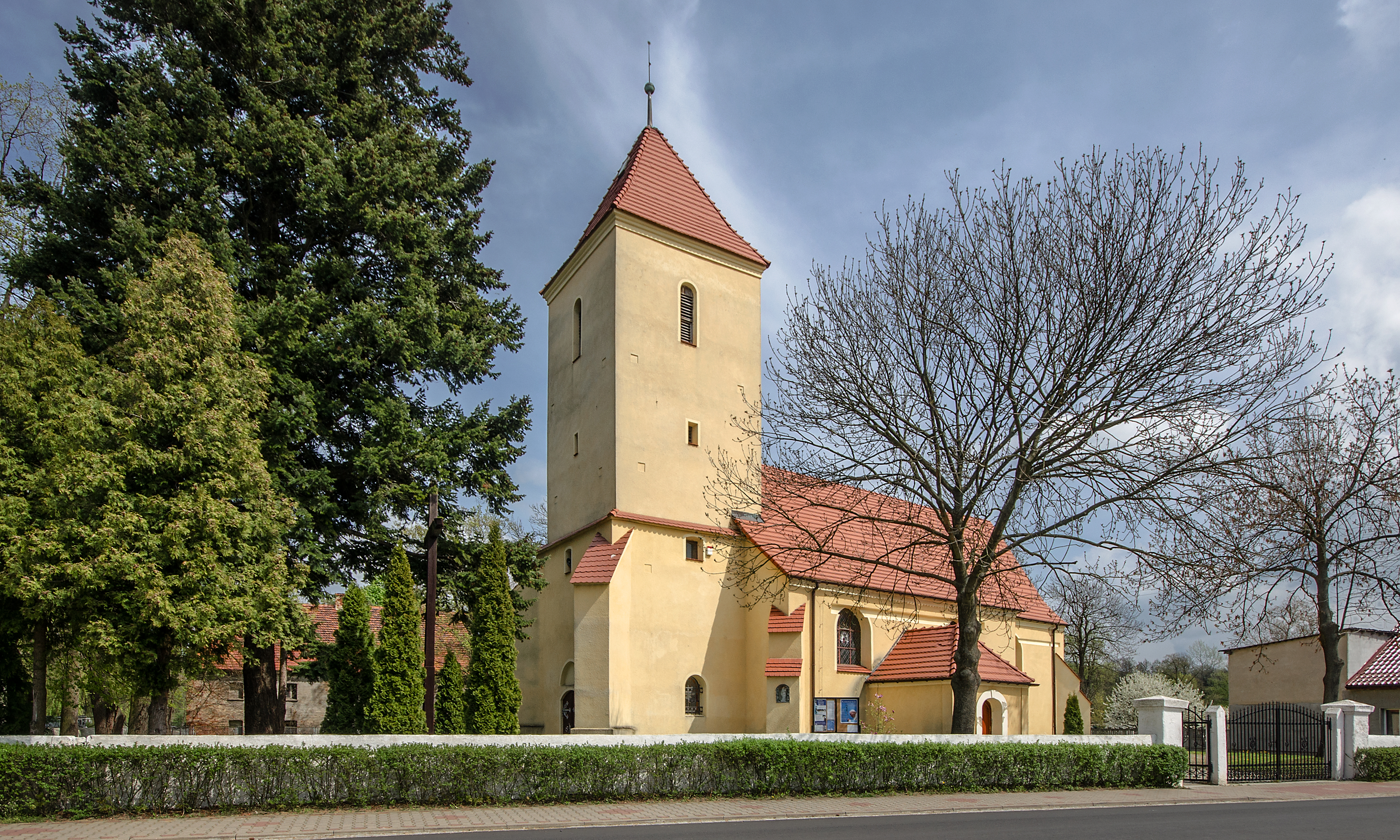

- Location within Poland
- Coordinates: 51°35′19″N 16°15′57″E
- Country: Poland
- Voivodeship: Lower Silesian
- County: Polkowice
- Gmina: Grębocice

Rzeczyca [ʐɛˈt͡ʂɨt͡sa] (German: Rietschütz) is a village in the administrative district of Gmina Grębocice, in Polkowice County, Lower Silesian Voivodeship, in southwestern Poland.
