= Szymocin =

- Village
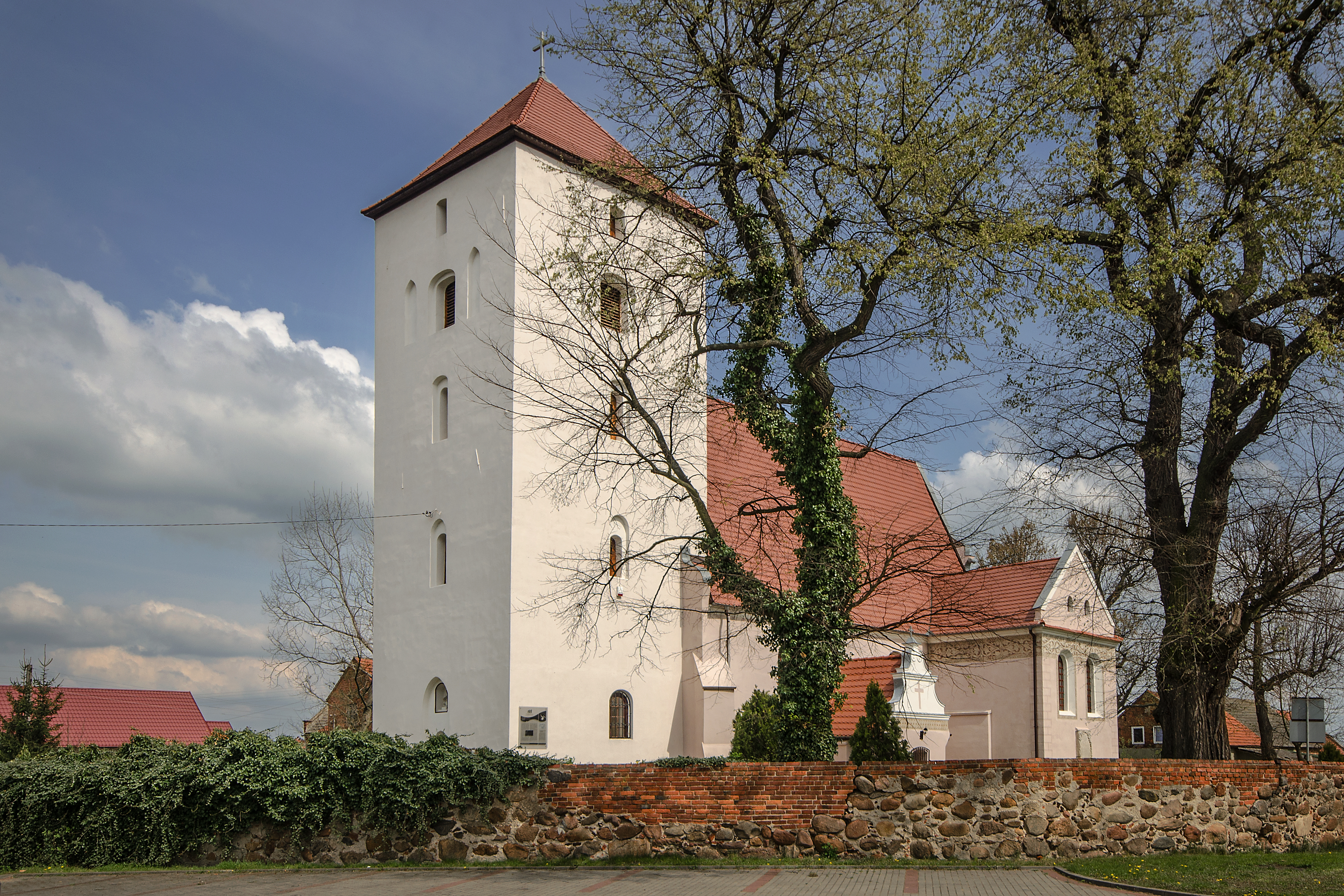
- Catholic church

- Location within Poland
- Coordinates: 51°36′N 16°14′E
- Country: Poland
- Voivodeship: Lower Silesian
- County: Polkowice
- Gmina: Grębocice

Szymocin (Polish pronunciation: [ʂɨˈmɔt͡ɕin], German: Simbsen) is a village in the administrative district of Gmina Grębocice, within Polkowice County, Lower Silesian Voivodeship, in south-western Poland.
