= Retków mine =

Copper mine in Poland

- Location: Retków, Polkowice County, Poland
- Products: Copper
- Opened: 2004
- Company: KGHM Polska Miedź

The Retków mine is a large mine in the west of Poland in Retków, Polkowice County, 350 km south-west of the capital, Warsaw. Retków represents one of the largest copper and silver reserve in Poland having estimated reserves of 135.8 million tonnes of ore grading 1.77% copper and 86 g/tonnes silver. The annual ore production is around 2 million tonnes from which 35,400 tonnes of copper and 172 tonnes of silver are extracted.
