= Grodowiec =

- Village
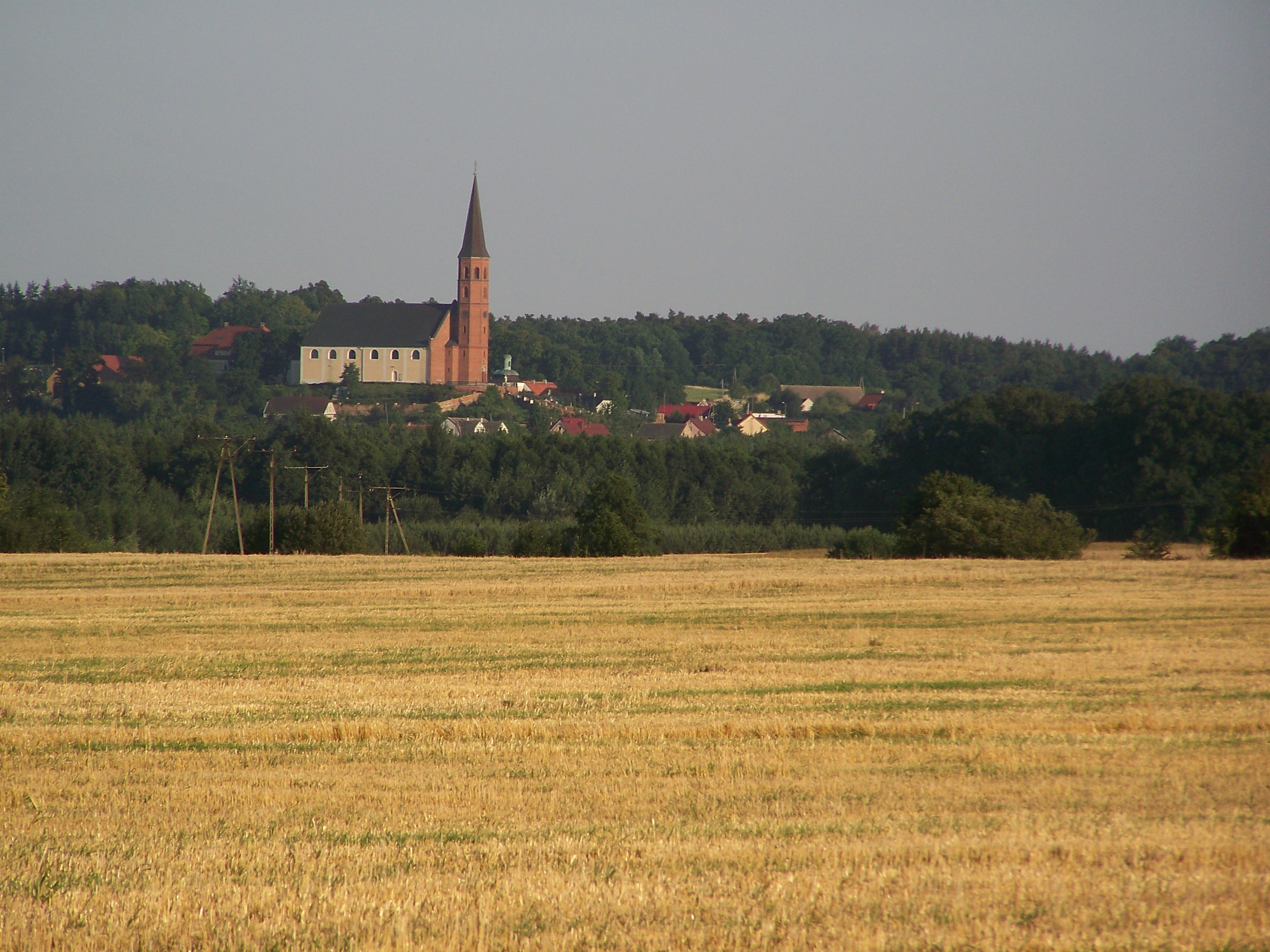

- Location within Poland
- Coordinates: 51°32′40″N 16°10′19″E
- Country: Poland
- Voivodeship: Lower Silesian
- County: Polkowice
- Gmina: Grębocice
- Population: 150

Grodowiec [ɡrɔˈdɔvjɛt͡s] (German: Hochkirch) is a village in the administrative district of Gmina Grębocice, within Polkowice County, Lower Silesian Voivodeship, in south-western Poland.

The pilgrimage site of Wysoka Cerkiew is organized around a parish church built in 1724, with furniture of the period; the tower was added ca. 1860. The oldest elements are fifteen small Rosary Chapels, built ca. 1660. Sets of stairs with terraces and sculptures (ca. 1736) and the Chapel of the Mount of Olives (1755) were added later.
