= Martha Remmert =

German woman classical pianist

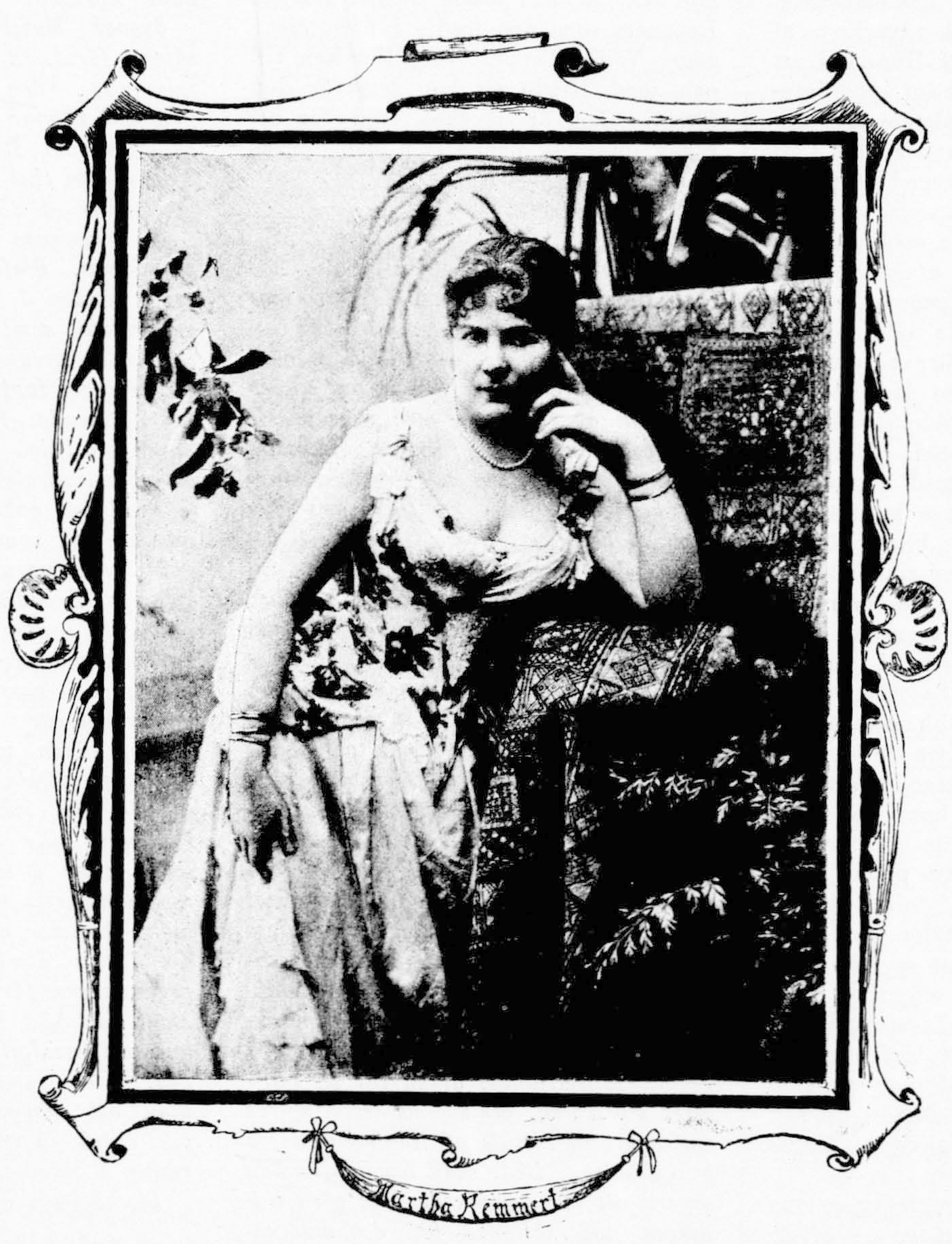
Martha Remmert ca. 1891

Martha Remmert (4 August 1853 – 24 January 1941) was a German classical pianist, music educator, conductor and music writer.

== Life ==
Remmert was born in Gross Schwein. She received her first piano lessons from her mother and the family tutor. She took piano lessons from 1860 to 1865 in Glogau with Ludwig Meinardus and in 1865 and 1866 with Wilhelm Tappert, a pupil of Theodor Kullak. Probably against her parents' will, Remmert went to Berlin around 1867 to study piano with the Kullak and Carl Tausig. She lived there with her grandmother Friederike Späth. When her grandmother died in 1871, her parents tried to persuade Martha to give up her studies. Through the intercession of Anton Rubinstein, whom she had met in Berlin, the Grand Duchess Elena Pawlowna supported Remmert financially in her education. She was thus able to continue her education in Berlin until 1871. From 1871, she continued her piano studies with Franz Liszt, first in Weimar and then in Budapest.

From 1873 to about 1900, she built up a successful international career as a soloist and chamber musician. She undertook concert tours which took her through Germany, the Baltic States, Russia and to Greece, Egypt and Turkey.

After about 1900 Remmert became more involved in institutionalised musical life. Here she sought to make the artistic and pedagogical approaches of Franz Liszt fruitful. In 1900, she founded the "Franz Liszt-Academie" in Berlin, where musicians received a wide range of training. In 1905, she founded the "Franz Liszt-Gesellschaft" and was its director until 1929. In this function, she organised numerous music festivals. During this period, she worked as conductor, composer and music writer.

Remmert died in Neuses bei Coburg at the age of 87.

== Sources ==
- Silke Wenzel (Hochschule für Musik und Theater Hamburg, MUGi) (2008). "Martha Remmert" (in German).
- Dieter Nolden (Sophie-Drinker-Institut) (2015). "Martha Remmert" (in German).
- Deutsche Biographie. "Martha Remmert" (in German).
