= Czarny Las, Ruda Śląska =

Czarny Las
- Ruda Śląska District
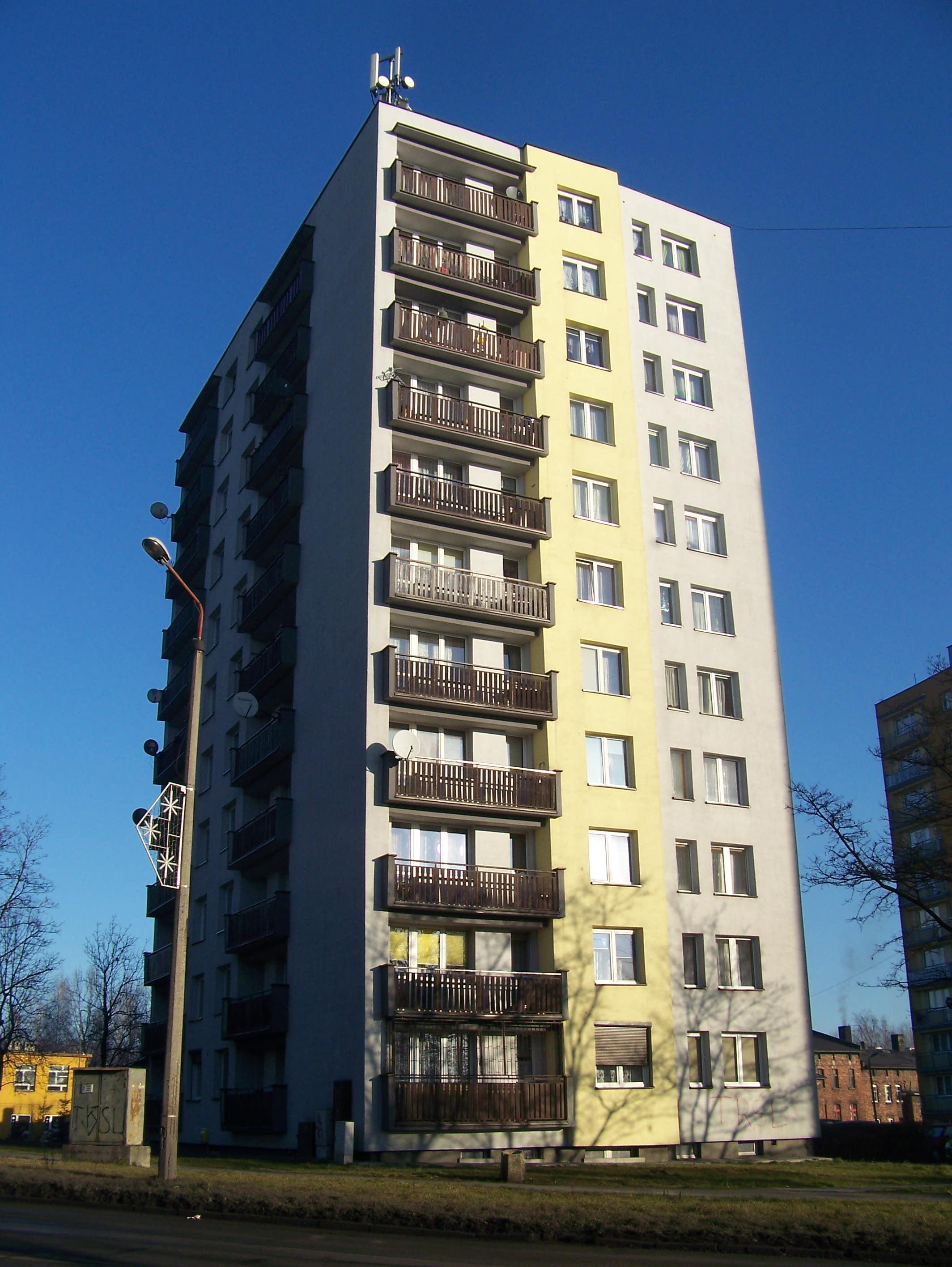
- 1 Maja 324 Street, district Czarny Las, Ruda Śląska.
- Interactive map of Czarny Las
- Coordinates: 50.280278°N 18.858889°E
- Country: Poland
- Voivodeship: Silesian
- County/City: Ruda Śląska
- First mentioned: 1668
- Within city limits: 2006
- Time zone: UTC+1 (CET)
  - Summer (DST): UTC+2 (CEST)
- Area code: (+48) 032
- Vehicle registration: SL, SRS
- Primary airport: Katowice Airport

Czarny Las (German: Schwarzwald) is a district in the centre of Ruda Śląska, Silesian Voivodeship, southern Poland.

== History ==
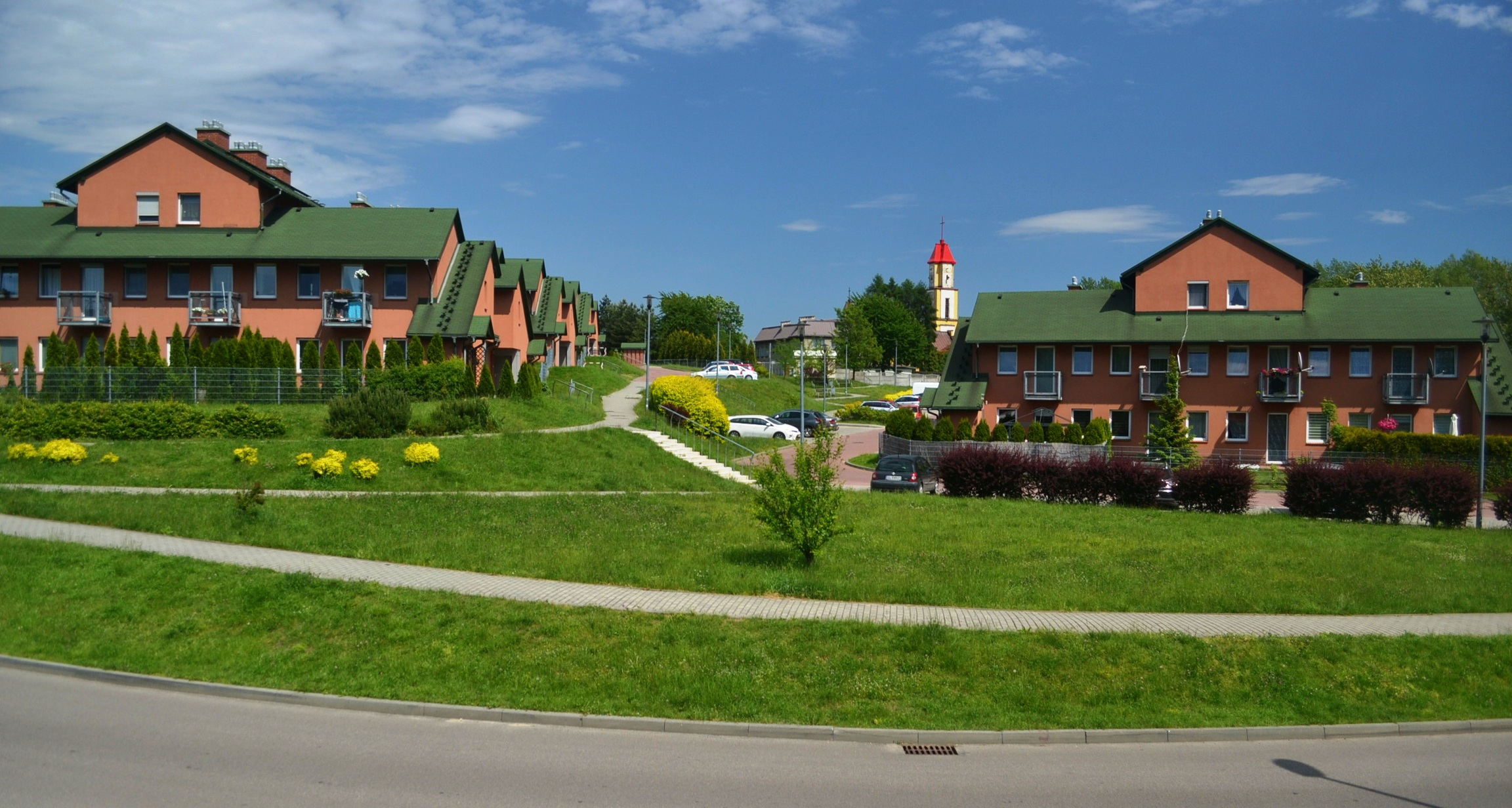
Housing estate on Cynkowa Street in Czarny Las

The name Czarny Las (Black Forest) was first mentioned in Polish in 1668 as “Miejski Czarny Las” (Urban Black Forest). The term “black forest” may have come from the coniferous trees growing in the area. Since the Middle Ages, this area has been a forest belonging to the city of Bytom.

In 1884–1885, St. Joseph's Church in Czarny Las (now defunct) was built. The area of Czarny Las was separated from Bytom in 1922, after Czarny Las was incorporated into Poland. Czarny Las then became part of the new independent municipality of Nowy Bytom (initially called Polskie Bytom). In 1959, Nowy Bytom became part of Ruda Śląska as an administrative district.

In 2006, Ruda Śląska city council decided to separate the small area of the city into a new district, taking away parts of the Wirek, Nowy Bytom and Bielszowice districts.

In 2016, a new District Court building was constructed on Bukowa Street. Previously, the court was located in the old town hall building in Wirek.

== Transportation ==
The district is crossed by provincial road No. 925 and the N-S route connecting Drogowa Trasa Średnicowa with the A4 motorway. Key transport lines for the city stop at the intersection in the central part: 6, 23, 39, 146, 147, 155, 199, 230, and 255. The lines run through every district of the city and allow to reach the neighboring cities of Bytom, Chorzów, Gliwice, Katowice, Świętochłowice and Zabrze.
