= Jankowice Coal Mine =

Coal mine in Rybnik, Silesian Voivodeship, Poland

Coordinates: 50.0471°N 18.5859°E

Jankowice coal mine
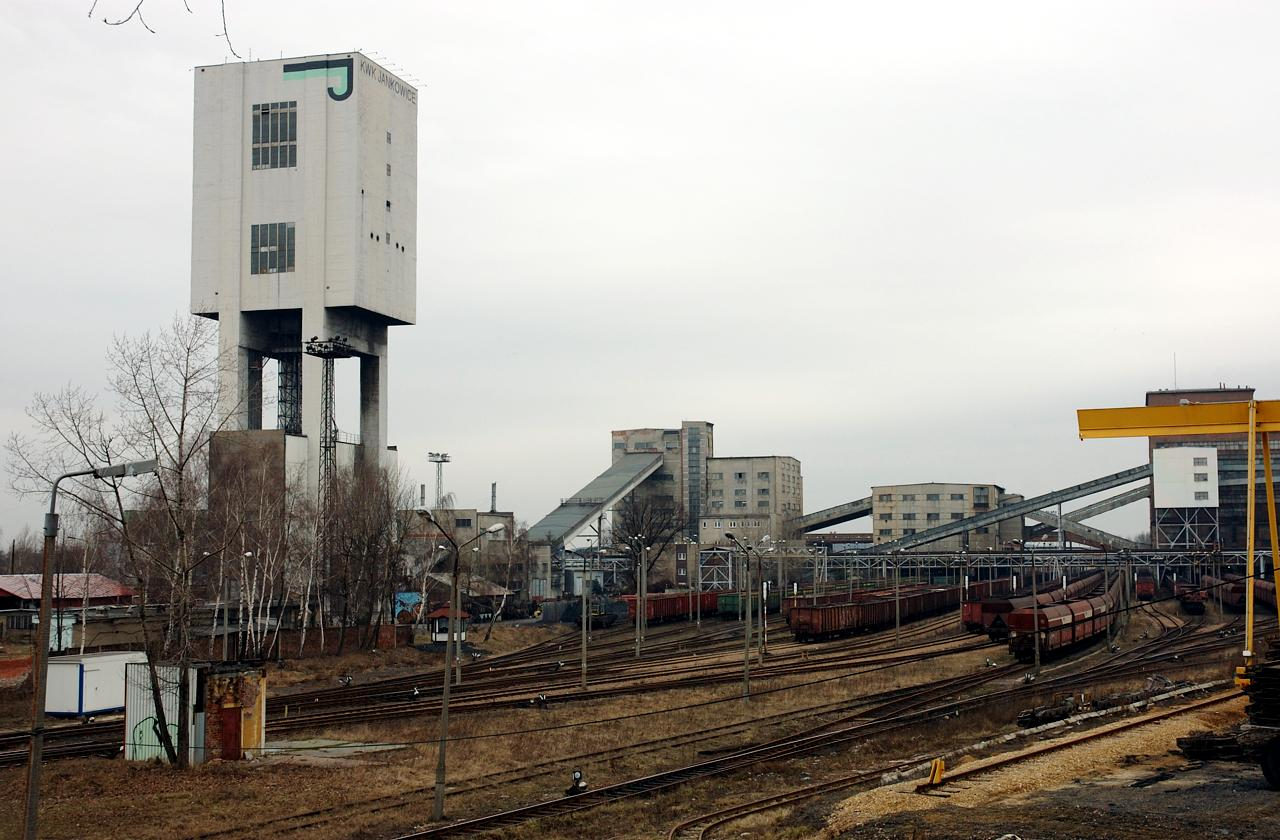
- Interactive map of Jankowice coal mine
- Location: Rybnik, Silesian Voivodeship, Poland
- Products: Coal
- Production: 8,560,000
- Opened: 1916
- Company: Kompania Węglowa

The Jankowice coal mine is a large mine in the south of Poland in Rybnik, Silesian Voivodeship, 294 km south-west of the capital, Warsaw. Jankowice represents one of the largest coal reserve in Poland having estimated reserves of 211.7 million tonnes of coal. The annual coal production is around 8.56 million tonnes.
