= Obiszów =

- Village
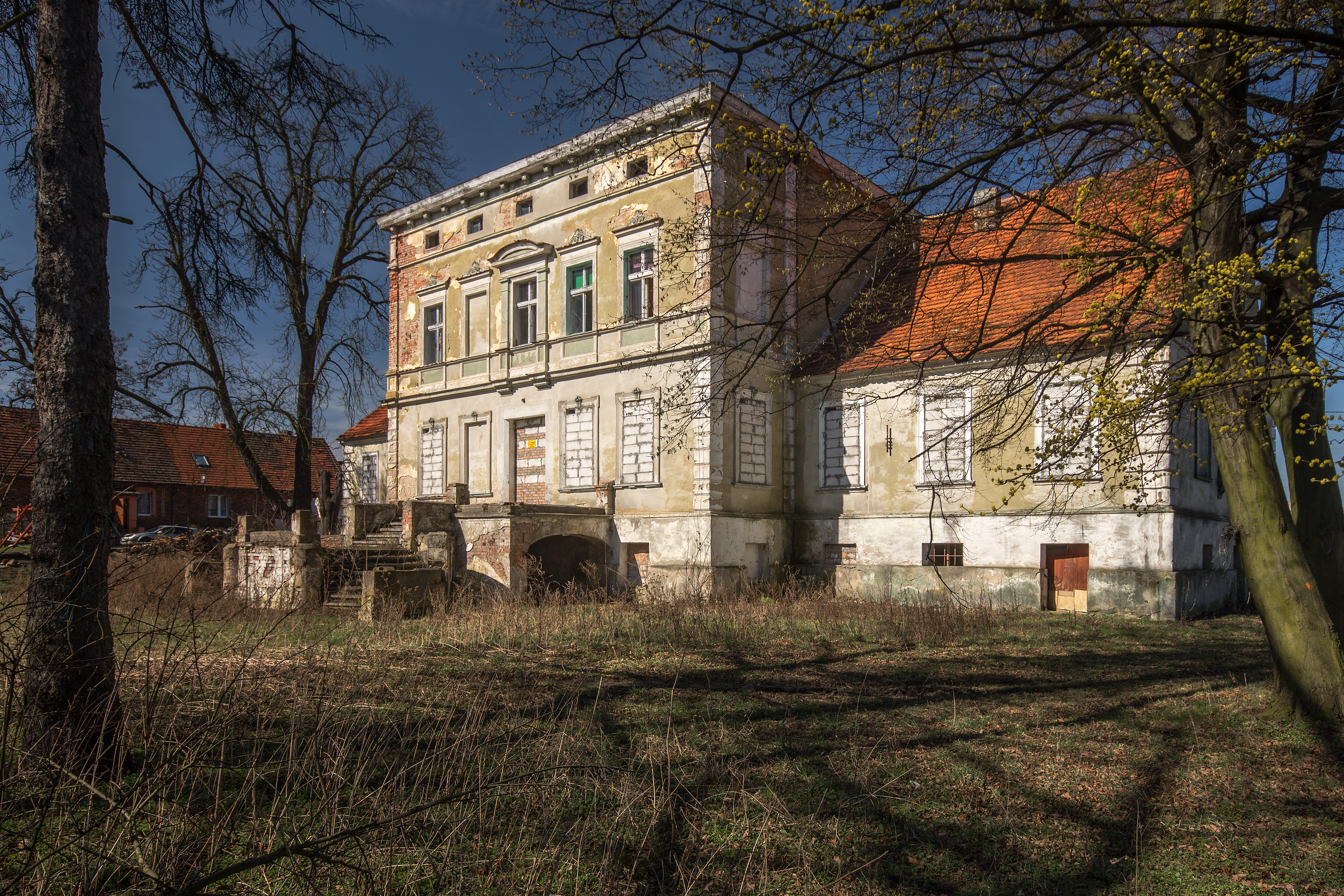
- Palace

- Location within Poland
- Coordinates: 51°34′51″N 16°6′22″E
- Country: Poland
- Voivodeship: Lower Silesian
- County: Polkowice
- Gmina: Grębocice

Obiszów [ɔˈbiʂuf] (German: Obisch) is a village in the administrative district of Gmina Grębocice, within Polkowice County, Lower Silesian Voivodeship, in south-western Poland.
