= Gmina Grębocice =

Gmina Grębocice Grębocice Commune
- Gmina
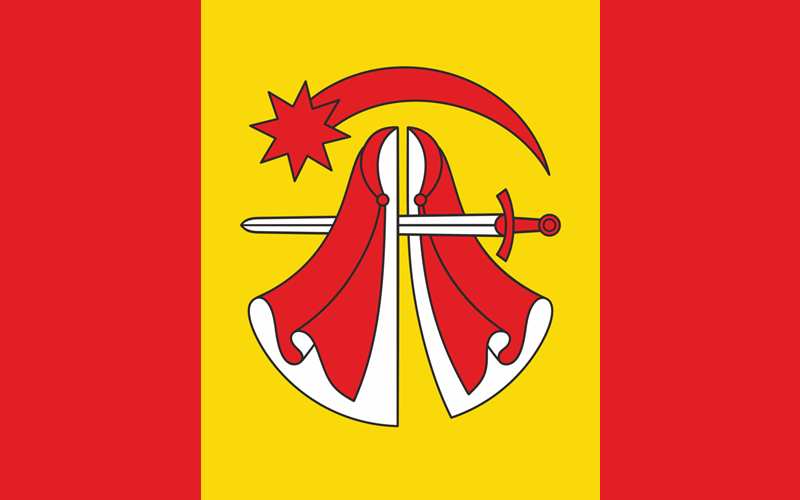
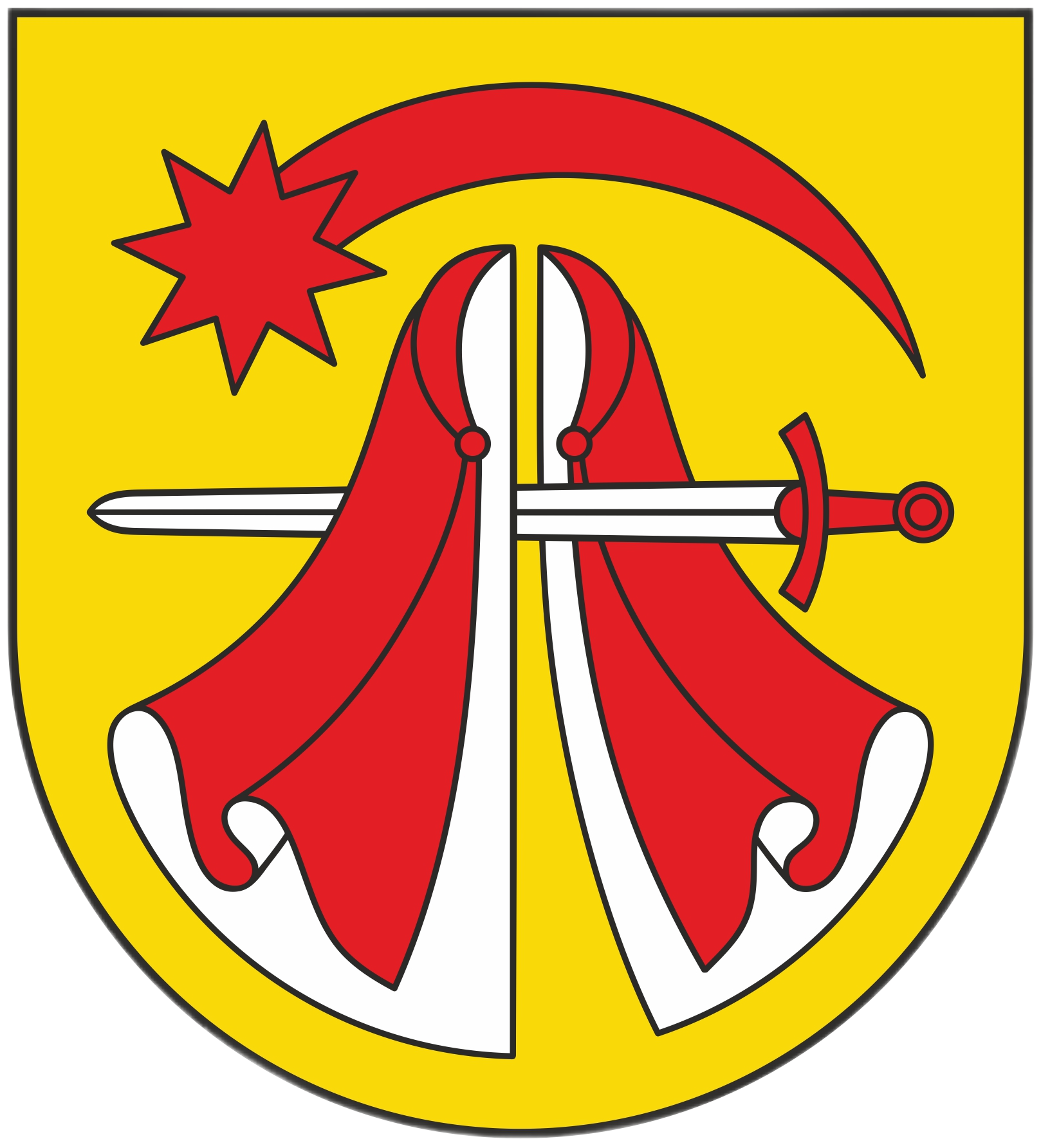
- Flag Coat of arms
- Interactive map of Gmina Grębocice
- Coordinates (Grębocice): 51°35′53″N 16°09′57″E
- Country: Poland
- Voivodeship: Lower Silesian
- County: Polkowice
- Seat: Grębocice
- Sołectwos: Bucze, Duża Wólka, Grębocice, Grodowiec, Grodziszcze, Krzydłowice, Kwielice, Obiszów, Ogorzelec, Proszyce, Retków, Rzeczyca, Stara Rzeka, Szymocin, Trzęsów, Wilczyn, Żabice

Area
  - Total: 121.89 km^{2} (47.06 sq mi)

Population (2019-06-30)
  - Total: 5,358
  - Density: 43.96/km^{2} (113.8/sq mi)
- Website: http://www.grebocice.com.pl/

Gmina Grębocice is a rural gmina (administrative district) in Polkowice County, Lower Silesian Voivodeship, in south-western Poland. Its seat is the village of Grębocice, which lies approximately 13 kilometres (8 mi) north-east of Polkowice, and 81 kilometres (50 mi) north-west of the regional capital Wrocław.

The gmina covers an area of 121.89 square kilometres (47.1 sq mi), and as of 2019 its total population is 5,358.

== Neighbouring gminas ==
Gmina Grębocice is bordered by the gminas of Głogów, Jerzmanowa, Pęcław, Polkowice and Rudna.

== Villages ==
The gmina contains the villages of Bucze, Duża Wólka, Grębocice, Grodowiec, Grodziszcze, Krzydłowice, Kwielice, Obiszów, Ogorzelec, Proszyce, Retków, Rzeczyca, Stara Rzeka, Szymocin, Trzęsów, Wilczyn and Żabice.
