= Sośnica-Makoszowy Coal Mine =

Coal mine in Poland

Coordinates: 50.2733°N 18.7735°E

Sośnica-Makoszowy coal mine
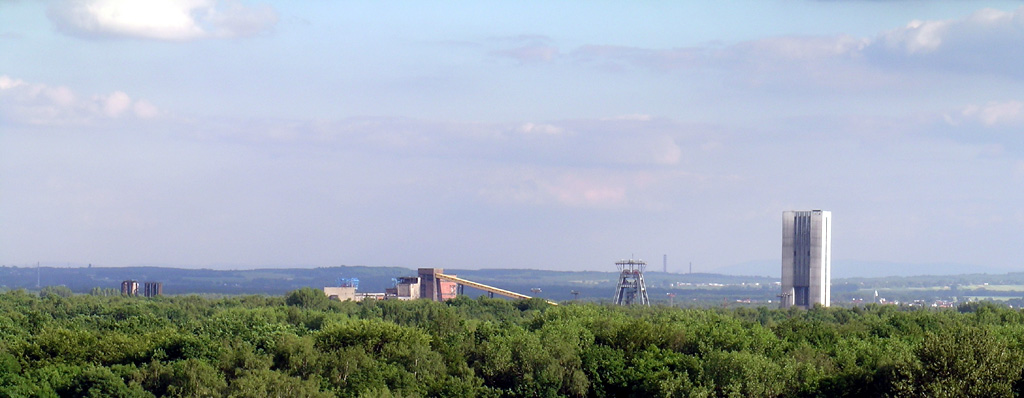
- KWK Sośnica-Makoszowy, the Makoszowy shaft
- Interactive map of Sośnica-Makoszowy coal mine
- Location: Gliwice, Zabrze, Silesian Voivodeship, Poland
- Products: Coal
- Production: 4,270,000
- Opened: 1897
- Company: Kompania Węglowa

The Sośnica-Makoszowy coal mine is a large mine in the south of Poland near Gliwice and Zabrze, Silesian Voivodeship, 267 km south-west of the capital, Warsaw. Sośnica-Makoszowy represents one of the largest coal reserves in Poland, having estimated reserves of 180 million tonnes of coal. The annual coal production is around 4.27 million tonnes.
