= Kujawy mine =

- Interactive map of Kujawy mine
- Location: Kuyavian-Pomeranian Voivodeship, Poland; 52.825°N 17.988°E
- Products: limestone
- Company: Lafarge
- Website: lafarge.pl

The Kujawy mine is the largest Polish limestone quarry. It is located in Bielawy in Kuyavian-Pomeranian Voivodeship in northern Poland. It is owned by the Lafarge company.

== See also ==
- List of mines in Poland
