= Ziemowit Coal Mine =

Coal mine in Lędziny, Poland

Coordinates: 50.1258°N 19.1281°E

Ziemowit coal mine
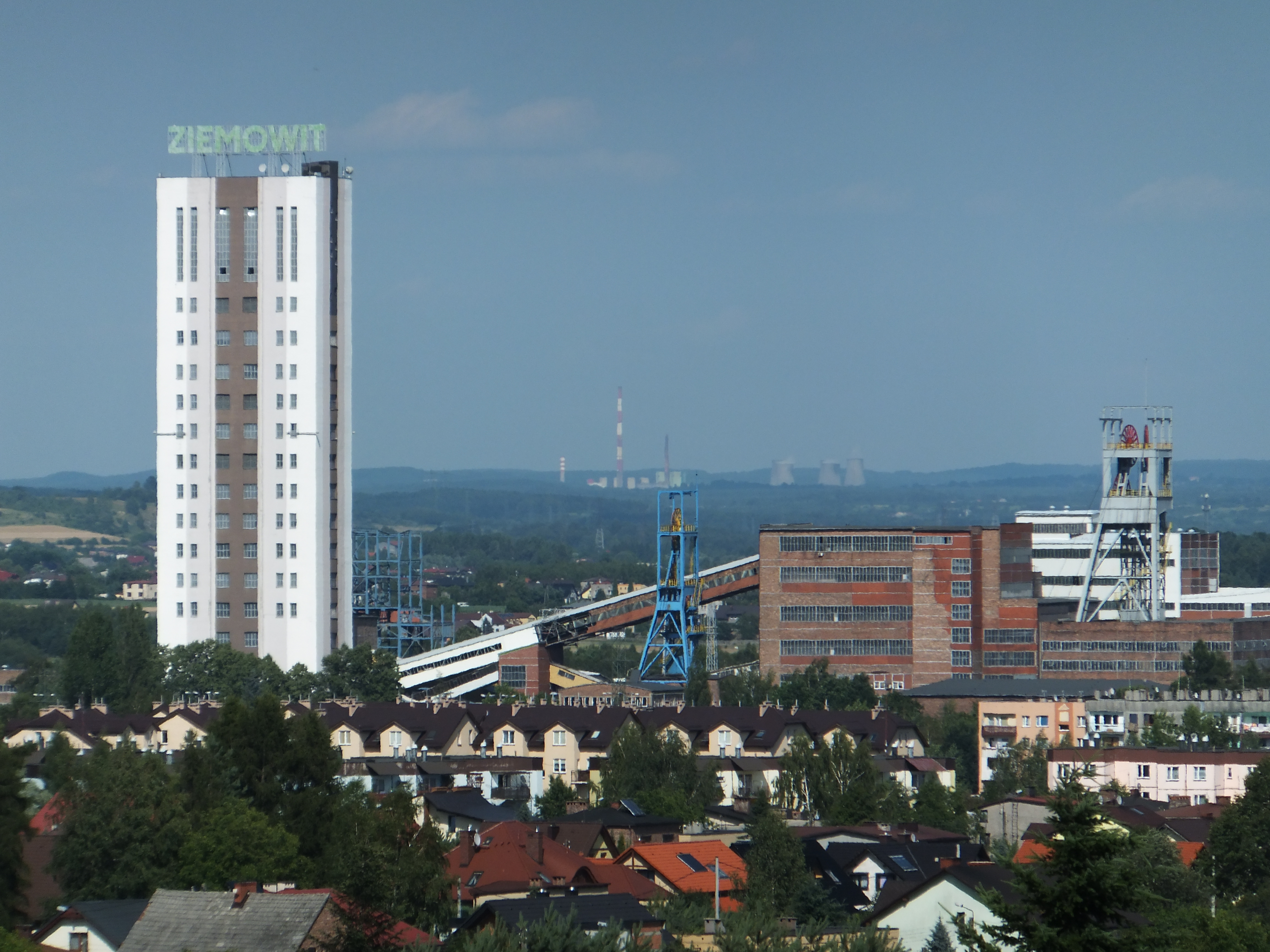
- Interactive map of Ziemowit coal mine
- Location: Lędziny, Silesian Voivodeship, Poland
- Products: Coal
- Production: 4,500,000
- Opened: 1952
- Company: Kompania Węglowa

The Ziemowit coal mine is a large mine in the south of Poland in Lędziny, Silesian Voivodeship, 310 km south-west of the capital, Warsaw. Ziemowit represents one of the largest coal reserves in Poland having estimated reserves of 133 million tonnes of coal. The annual coal production is around 4.5 million tonnes.
