= Bielszowice Coal Mine =

Coal mine in Ruda Śląska, Poland

Bielszowice coal mine
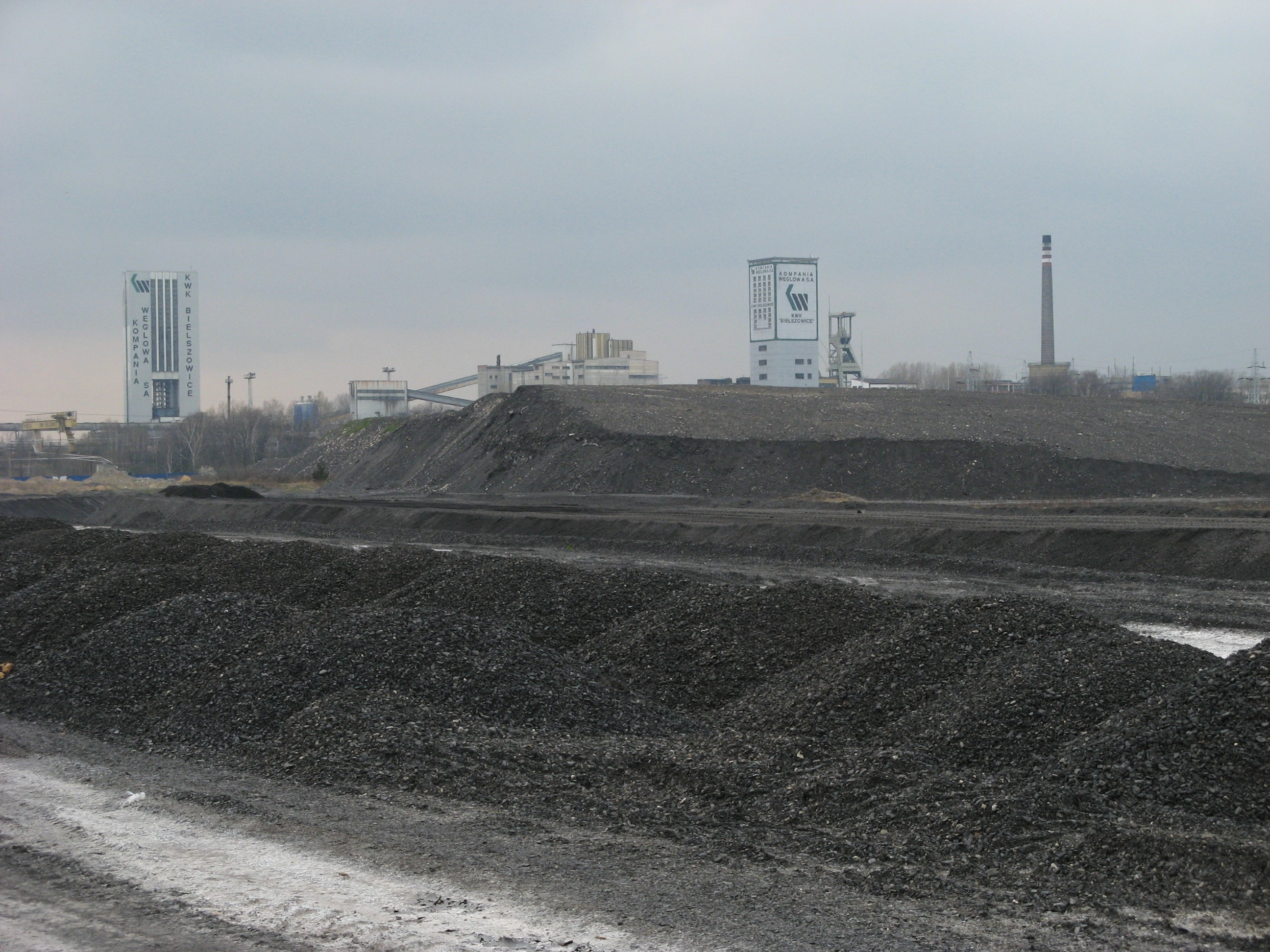
- KWK Bielszowice

- Location within Poland
- Location: Bielszowice, Ruda Śląska, Silesian Voivodeship, Poland; 50°17′28.9″N 18°49′13.48″E
- Products: Coal
- Production: 4,000,000
- Opened: 1979
- Company: Kompania Węglowa

The Bielszowice coal mine is a large mine in the south of Poland in Bielszowice district of Ruda Śląska, Silesian Voivodeship, 267 km south-west of the capital, Warsaw. Bielszowice represents one of the largest coal reserve in Poland having estimated reserves of 284.2 million tonnes of coal. The annual coal production is around 4 million tonnes.
