= Kwielice =

- Village
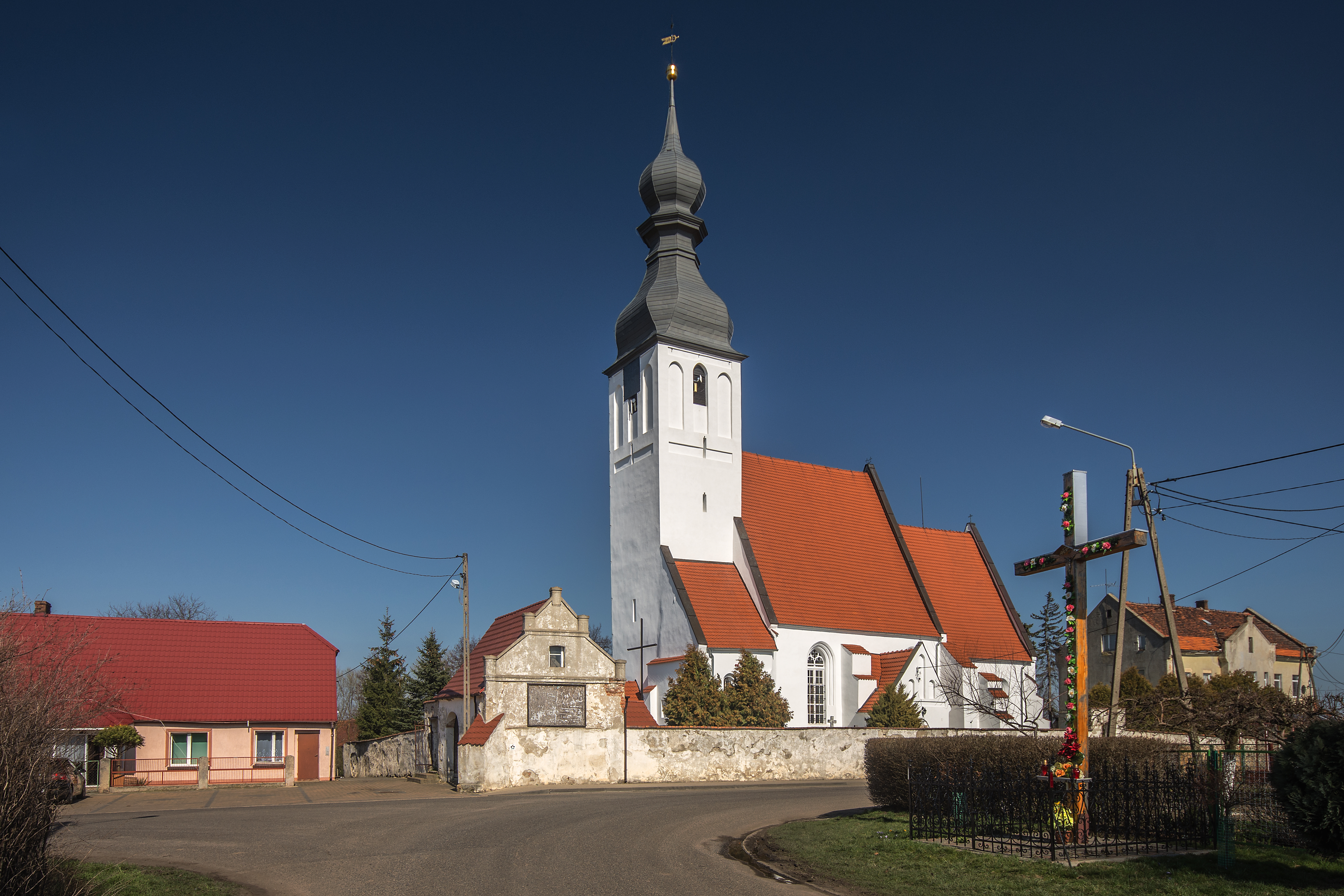
- Catholic church

- Location within Poland
- Coordinates: 51°36′N 16°7′E
- Country: Poland
- Voivodeship: Lower Silesian
- County: Polkowice
- Gmina: Grębocice

Kwielice [kfjɛˈlit͡sɛ] (German: Quilitz) is a village in the administrative district of Gmina Grębocice, within Polkowice County, Lower Silesian Voivodeship, in south-western Poland.
