= Waldemar Słomiany =

Polish footballer

Personal information
- Full name: Waldemar Piotr Słomiany
- Date of birth: 1 November 1943 (age 82)
- Place of birth: Bielszowice, German-occupied Poland
- Height: 1.84 m (6 ft 0 in)
- Position: Defender

Senior career*
Years	Team	Apps	(Gls)
1956–1961	Wawel Wirek		
1962–1966	Górnik Zabrze	93	(4)
1967–1970	Schalke 04	52	(5)
1970–1972	Arminia Bielefeld	46	(6)
1973–1975	HSV Hamm		

International career
1963	Poland	1	(0)
- * Club domestic league appearances and goals

Waldemar Piotr Słomiany (born 1 November 1943) is a Polish former professional footballer who played as a defender. Słomiany spent the most successful years of his career at Górnik Zabrze, winning several championships of Poland in the 1960s. He was capped once by Poland, on 16 October 1963, in a 3–1 loss to Greece.

Słomiany started his career in a local club Wawel Wirek, and in 1962 he moved to Górnik Zabrze, in which he played in 93 games, scoring 4 goals. In 1967, he illegally decided to stay in West Germany. He played for Bundesliga teams such as FC Schalke 04, and Arminia Bielefeld. In 1971, he was among players involved in corruption scandal (known in Germany as Bundesligaskandal), which resulted in his suspension and after that he did not resume playing. Altogether, Słomiany played 98 games in the Bundesliga, scoring 11 goals.

== Honours ==
Górnik Zabrze

- Ekstraklasa: 1962–63, 1963–64, 1964–65, 1965–66
- Polish Cup: 1964–65
