= Bielszowice =

- Ruda Śląska District
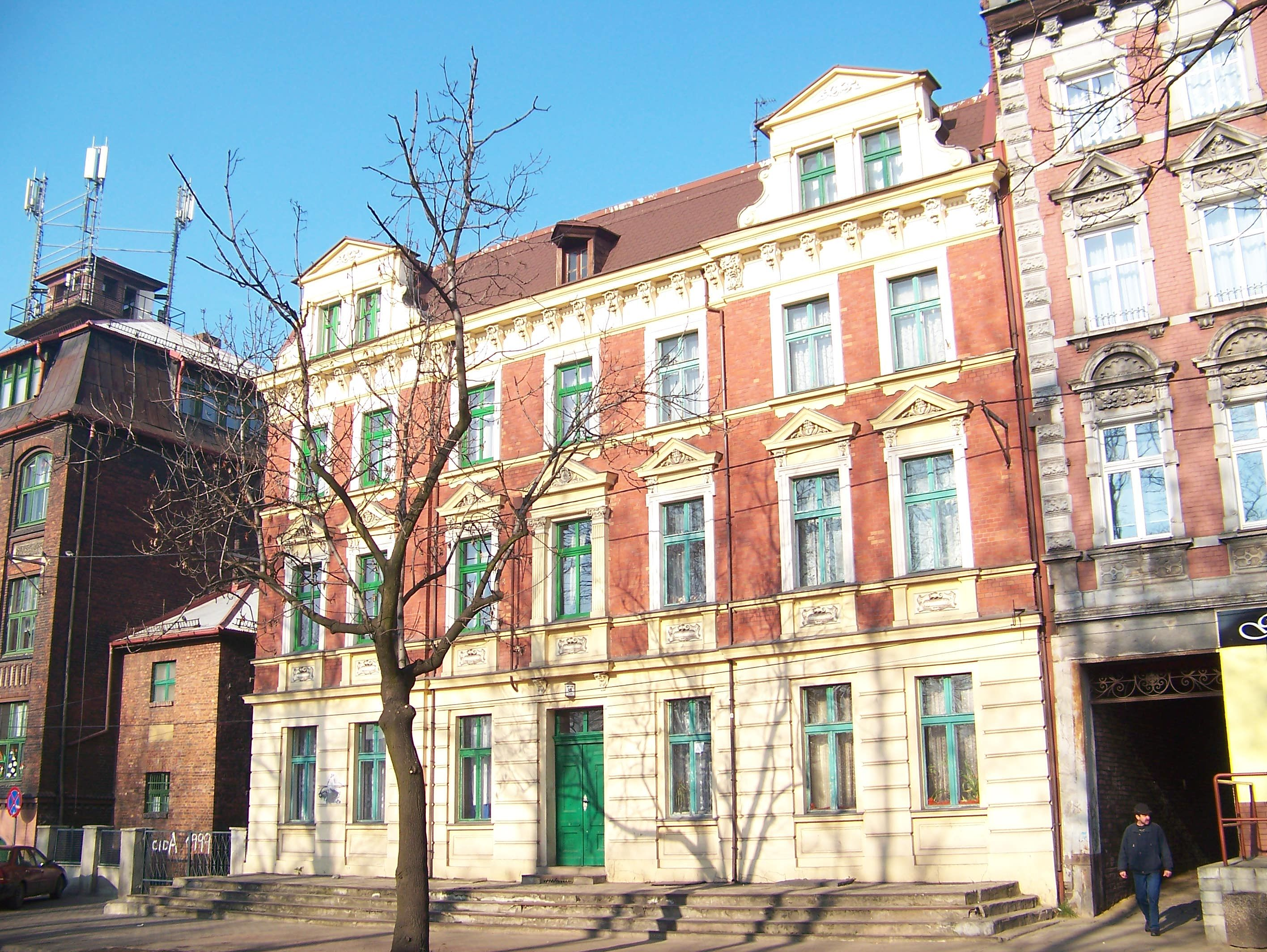
- Old tenement houses at Główna Street in Bielszowice

- Location of Bielszowice within Ruda Śląska
- Coordinates: 50.268508°N 18.834216°E
- Country: Poland
- Voivodeship: Silesian
- County/City: Ruda Śląska
- First mentioned: 1472
- Within city limits: 1959
- Time zone: UTC+1 (CET)
  - Summer (DST): UTC+2 (CEST)
- Area code: (+48) 032
- Vehicle registration: SL, SRS
- Primary airport: Katowice Airport

Bielszowice (German: Bielschowitz) is a district in the west of Ruda Śląska, Silesian Voivodeship, southern Poland. In 2006 it had an area of 10.6 km^{2} and was inhabited by 9,505 people. On January 12, 2006 a part of it was split off to form a new district, Czarny Las.

== History ==
The settlement was first mentioned in 1452 as Bilechowitz. It was a seat of a Catholic parish in Diocese of Kraków, established probably around 1440. The village was annexed by Prussia in the 18th century, and from 1871 it was also part of Germany. Beginning with the 19th century it was heavily affected by industrial development. Bielszowice Coal Mine was built in years 1896–1904. In 1891 the German state purchased the village from private hands.

After World War I in the Upper Silesia plebiscite 4,546 out of 6,461 voters in Bielszowice voted in favour of rejoining Poland which just regained independence, against 1,874 opting for staying in Germany. Afterwards it became a part of Silesian Voivodeship, Second Polish Republic. During the German invasion of Poland, which started World War II, the village was invaded and then occupied by Nazi Germany, and already on September 3, 1939 the Germans carried out the first execution of a local Polish man (see Nazi crimes against the Polish nation). Edmund Kokot, notable local member of the Polish resistance movement, who as its secret agent joined and infiltrated the German SA, was publicly hanged by the Germans in Bielszowice in 1942. There is monument at the execution site. After the war, the settlement was restored to Poland.

Bielszowice constituted a gmina (municipality) that was merged into Nowy Bytom in 1951, and as part of Nowy Bytom was amalgamated with Ruda to form Ruda Śląska on December 31, 1958.

== Notable people ==
- Marian Foik (1933–2005), Polish male sprinter, silver medalist of the 1964 Summer Olympics
- Waldemar Słomiany (born 1943), retired Polish footballer and member of the Poland national football team
- Wiktor Skworc (born 1948), Polish Catholic bishop
- Adam Kompała (born 1973), retired Polish footballer

== Gallery ==
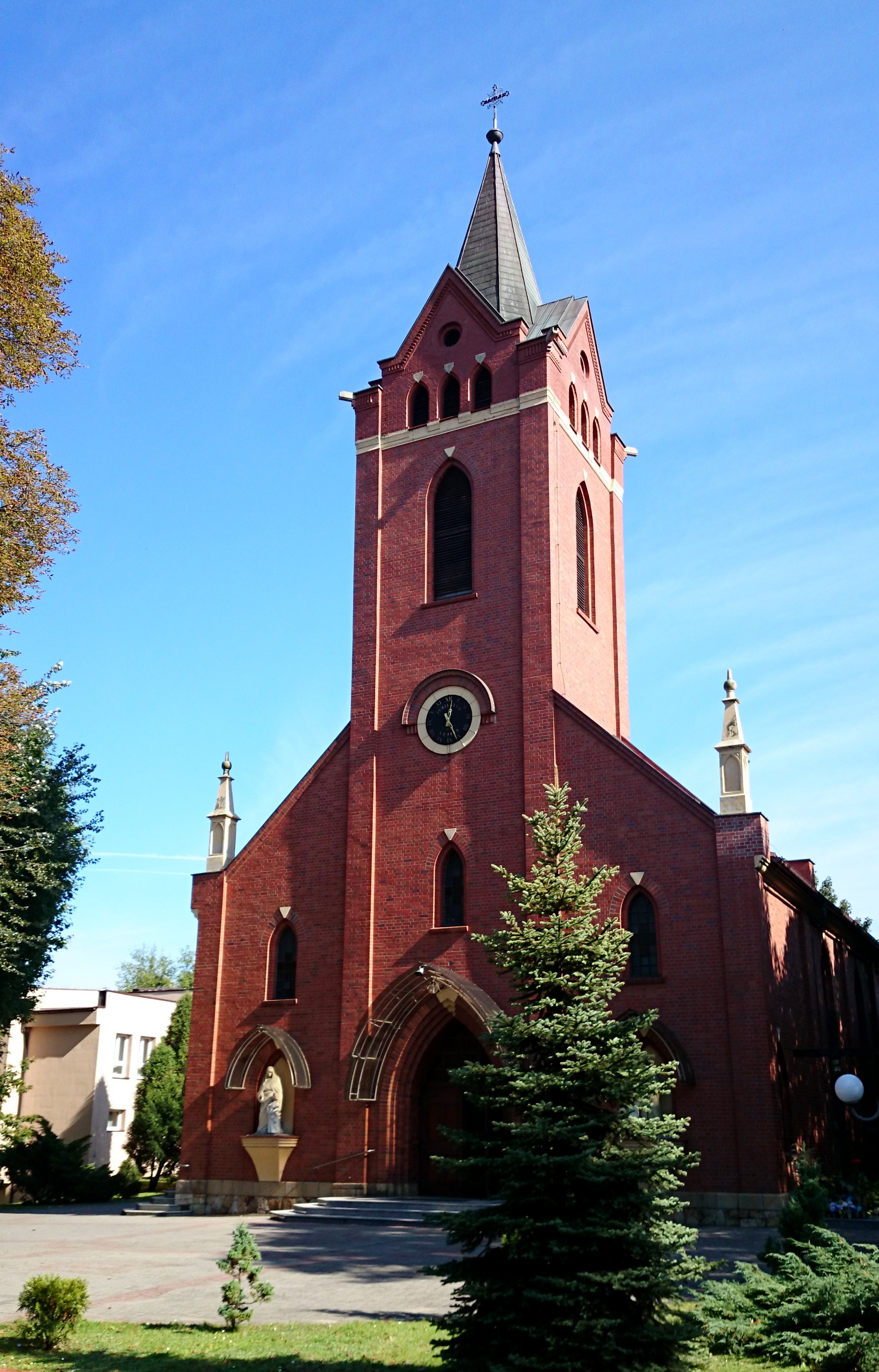
Saint Mary Magdalene church

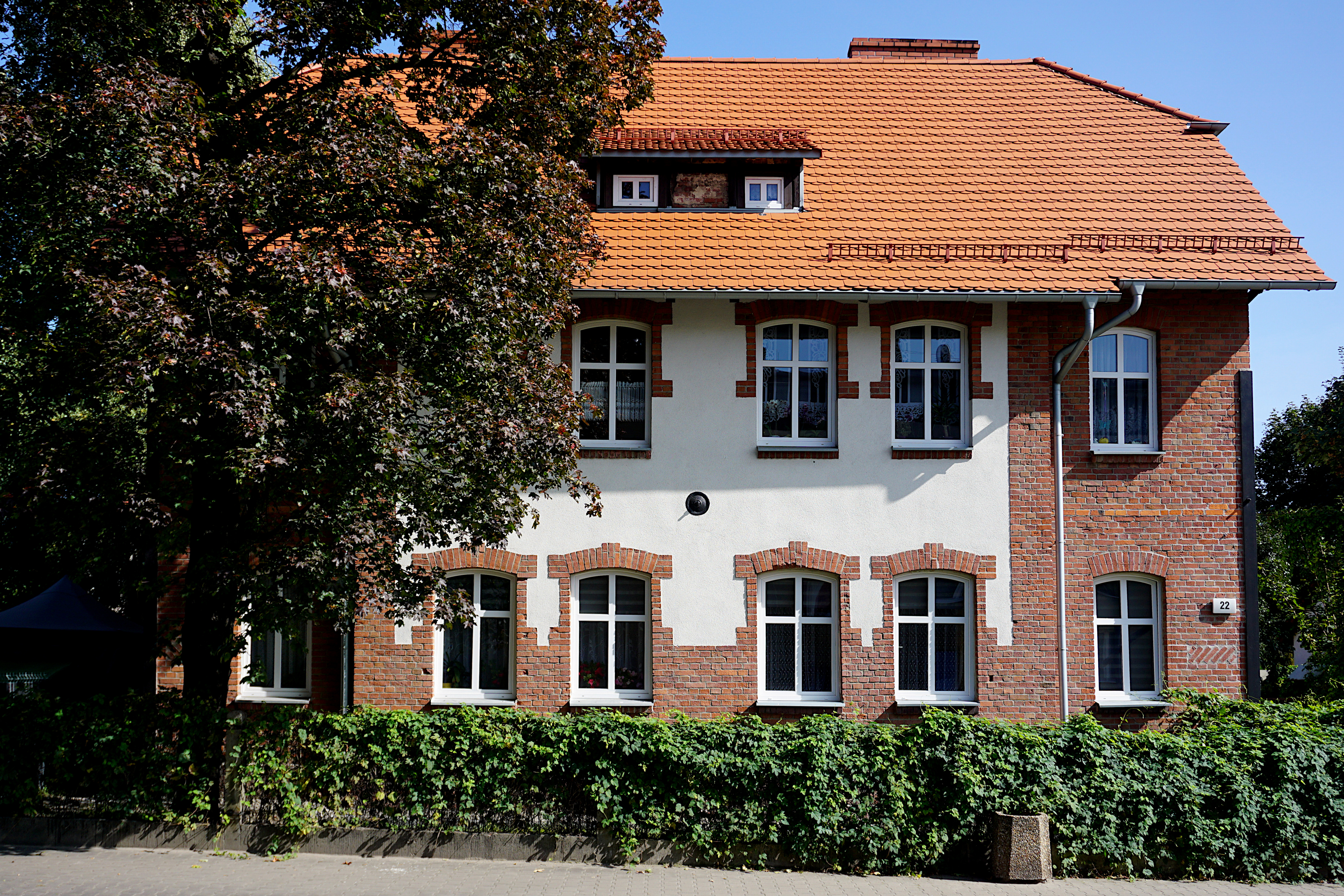
Typical old house at Niedzieli Street

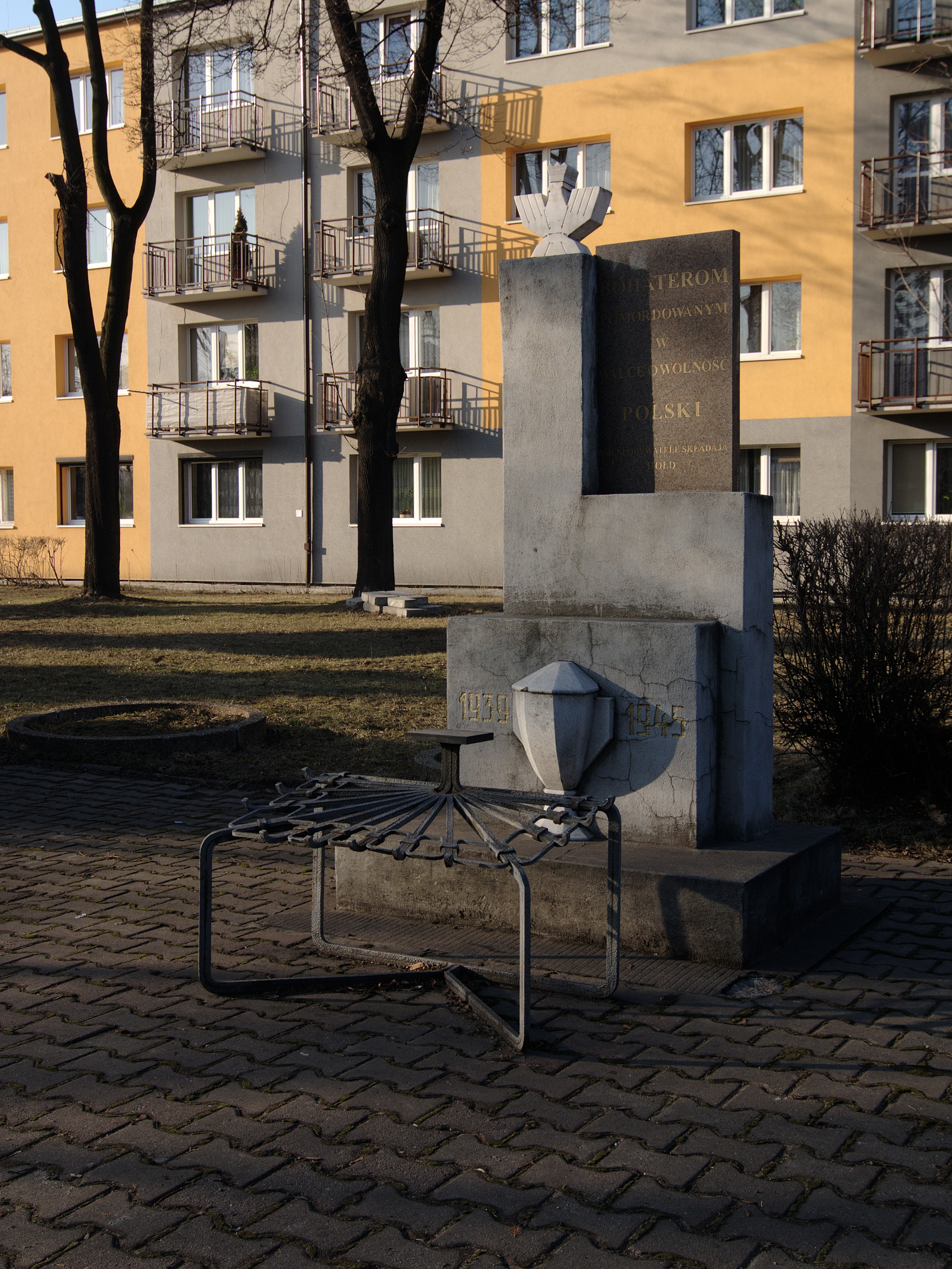
Monument at the site of the execution of Edmund Kokot

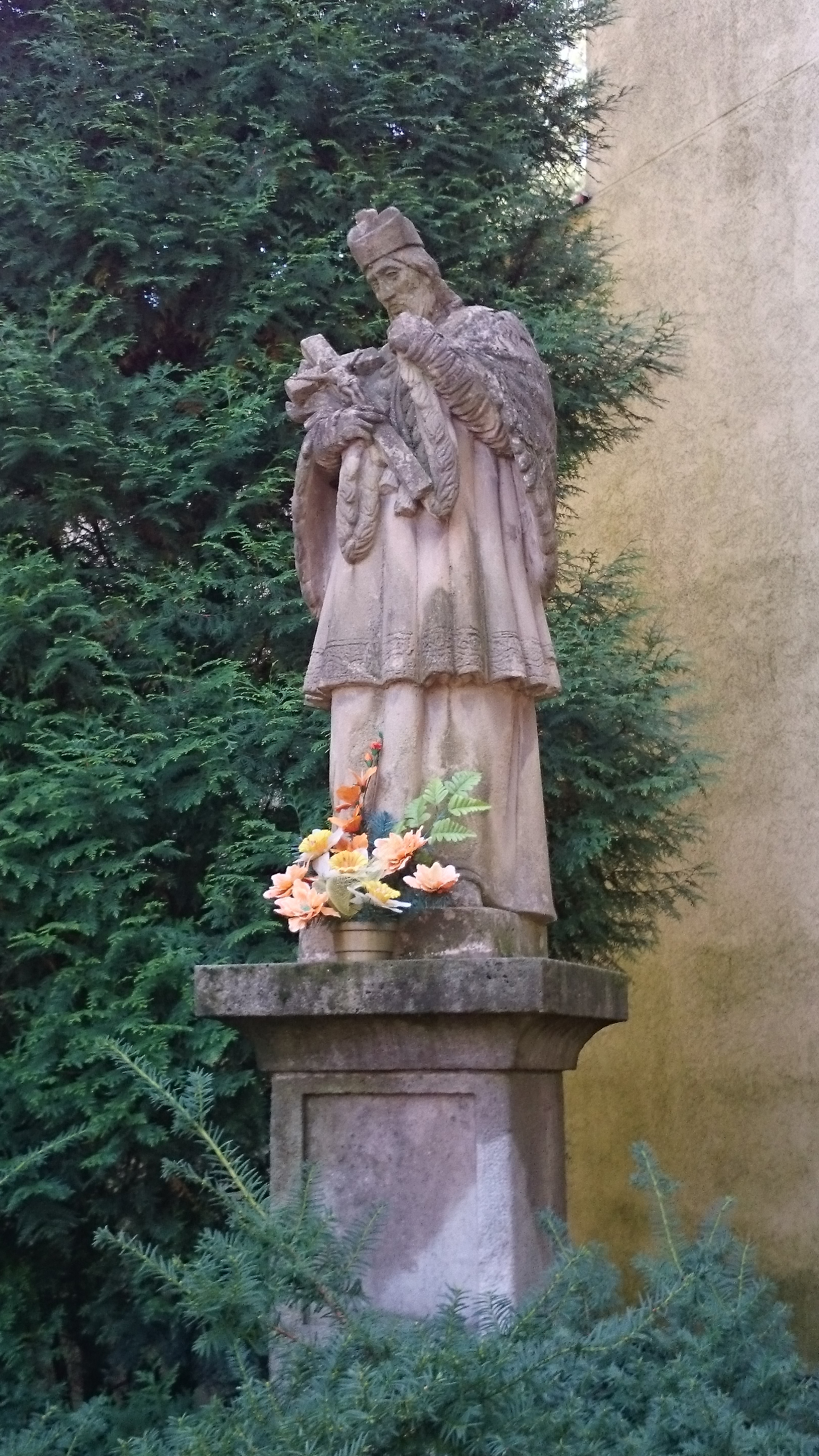
Statue of Saint John of Nepomuk
