= Wilczyn, Polkowice County =

Wilczyn
- Village
- Location within Poland
- Coordinates: 51°34′39″N 16°09′41″E
- Country: Poland
- Voivodeship: Lower Silesian
- County: Polkowice
- Gmina: Grębocice
- Time zone: UTC+1 (CET)
  - Summer (DST): UTC+2 (CEST)
- Vehicle registration: DPL

Wilczyn [ˈvilt͡ʂɨn] (German: Willschau) is a village in the administrative district of Gmina Grębocice, within Polkowice County, Lower Silesian Voivodeship, in south-western Poland.
