= Dęby Szlacheckie =

- Village
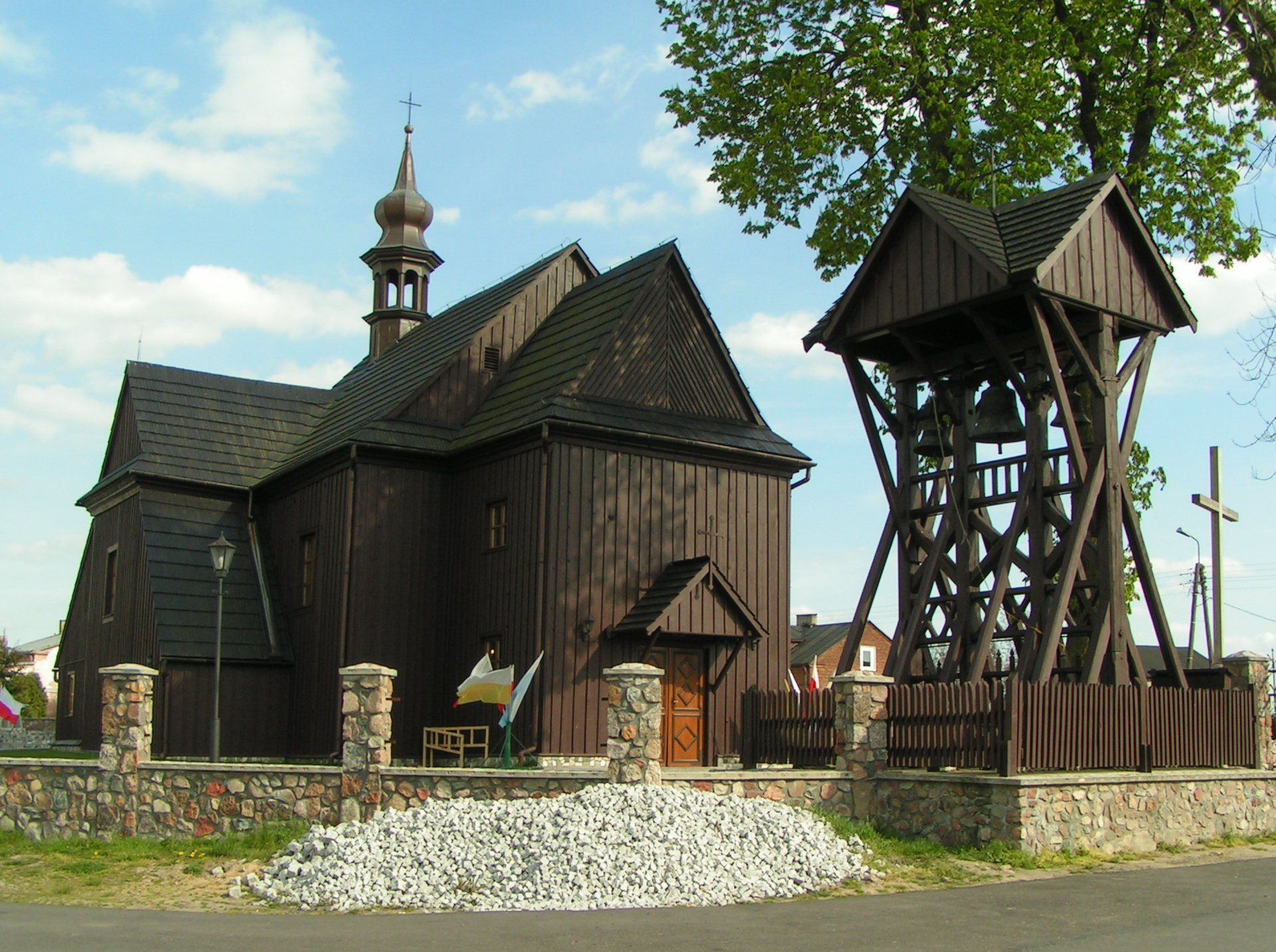
- Church of the Assumption in Dęby Szlacheckie

- Location within Poland
- Coordinates: 52°18′N 18°37′E
- Country: Poland
- Voivodeship: Greater Poland
- County: Koło
- Gmina: Osiek Mały

Population
  - Total: 730
- Time zone: UTC+1 (CET)
  - Summer (DST): UTC+2 (CEST)
- Vehicle registration: PKL

Dęby Szlacheckie [ˈdɛmbɨ ʂlaˈxɛt͡skʲɛ] is a village in the administrative district of Gmina Osiek Mały, within Koło County, Greater Poland Voivodeship, in central Poland.
