= Piaski Coal Deposit =

Mine in Poland

Piaski coal deposit
- Location: Piaski, Lublin Voivodeship, Poland
- Products: Coal
- Production: none

The Piaski coal deposit is a lignite deposit in the east of Poland in Piaski, Lublin Voivodeship, 200 km east of the capital, Warsaw. The Piaski lignite deposit has estimated reserves of 136.4 million tonnes of coal and an overburden to coal ratio of 7.3:1. The deposit is undeveloped but was considered potentially profitable. In 2020, PAK KWB Konin, a subsidiary of the polish utility company ZE PAK, decided to not develop the Piaski lignite deposit.
