= Szklary mine =

Nickel mine in Poland

- Location: Szklary, Ząbkowice County, Poland
- Products: Nickel
- Opened: 2009
- Company: Northern Mining Limited

The Szklary mine is a large mine in Szklary, Ząbkowice County in Poland, 340 km south-west of the capital, Warsaw. Szklary represents the largest nickel reserve in Poland having estimated reserves of 28.8 million tonnes of ore grading 0.73% nickel. The 28.8 million tonnes of ore contain 210,000 tonnes of nickel metal.
