= Drzewce Coal Mine =

Coal mine in Poland

Drzewce coal mine
- Location: Drzewce, Łódź Voivodeship, Poland
- Products: Coal
- Production: 2,300,000
- Opened: August 5, 2011
- Company: Kopalnia Wegla Brunatnego Drzewce

The Drzewce coal mine is a large mine in the centre of Poland in Drzewce, Greater Poland Voivodeship, 180 km west of the capital, Warsaw. Drzewce represents one of the largest coal reserve in Poland having estimated reserves of 39.9 million tonnes of coal. The annual coal production is around 2.3 million tonnes.
