= Mosty, Łódź Voivodeship =

Mosty
- Village
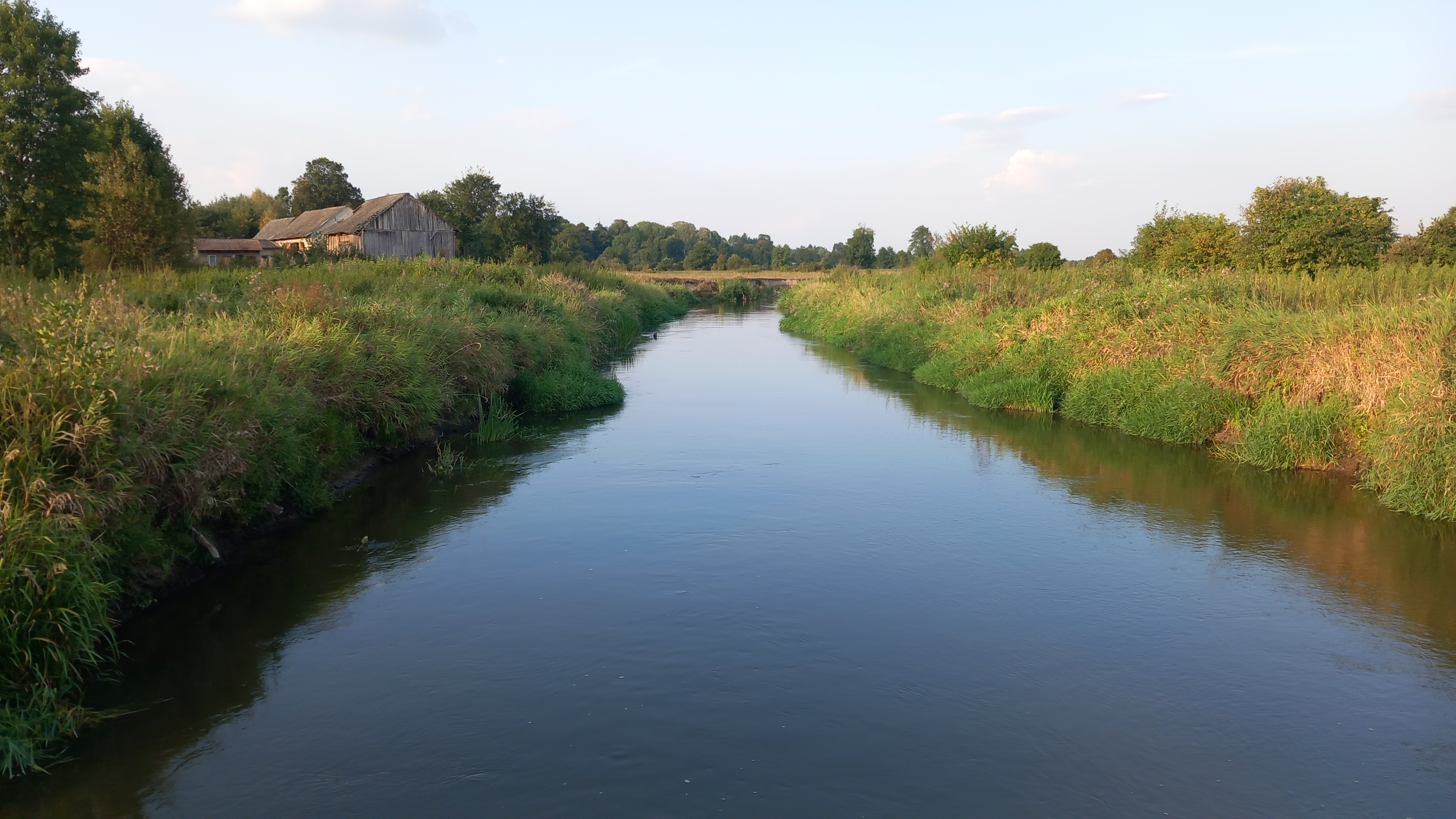

- Location within Poland
- Coordinates: 50°54′20″N 19°47′9″E
- Country: Poland
- Voivodeship: Łódź
- County: Radomsko
- Gmina: Żytno

Mosty [ˈmɔstɨ] is a village in the administrative district of Gmina Żytno, within Radomsko County, Łódź Voivodeship, in central Poland.
