= Legnica Coal Mine =

Mine in Poland

Legnica coal mine
- Location: Legnica, Lower Silesian Voivodeship, Poland
- Products: Lignite
- Production: none

The Legnica coal mine is a proposed lignite mine in the west of Poland in Legnica, Lower Silesian Voivodeship, 355 km west of the capital, Warsaw. Legnica represents one of the largest coal reserves in Poland having estimated reserves of 2,504 million tonnes of coal. In 2009, a local referendum in Kunice, Ruja, Miłkowice, Prochowice, Ścinawa, and Gmina Lubin decided against the construction of the mine. As of 2023, the Legnica coal mine was not constructed or in construction.
