= Retków, Lower Silesian Voivodeship =

Retków
- Village
- Location within Poland
- Coordinates: 51°35′22″N 16°12′12″E
- Country: Poland
- Voivodeship: Lower Silesian
- County: Polkowice
- Gmina: Grębocice
- First mentioned: 13th century
- Time zone: UTC+1 (CET)
  - Summer (DST): UTC+2 (CEST)
- Vehicle registration: DPL

Retków [ˈrɛtkuf] (German: Rettkau) is a village in the administrative district of Gmina Grębocice, within Polkowice County, Lower Silesian Voivodeship, in south-western Poland.

== History ==
The village was first mentioned in the 13th century, when it was part of fragmented Piast-ruled Poland. In the 18th century it was annexed by Prussia, and from 1871 to 1945 it also formed part of Germany. During World War II, a German forced labour subcamp of the prison in Jawor was operated in the village. After the defeat of Nazi Germany in the war in 1945, the village became again part of Poland.
