= Jas-Mos Coal Mine =

Coal mine in Jastrzębie-Zdrój, Silesian Voivodeship, Poland

Jas-Mos coal mine
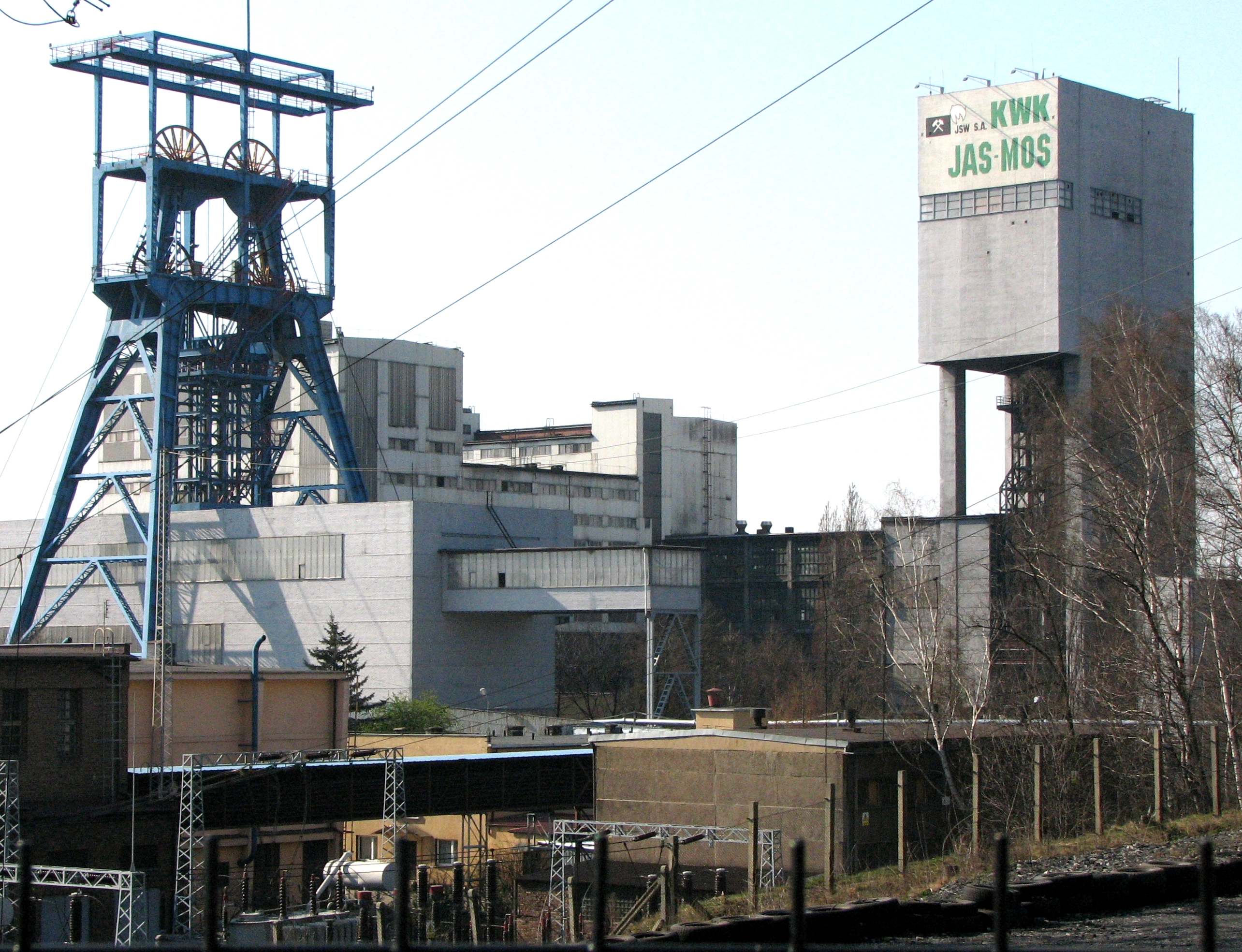

- Location in Poland
- Location: Jastrzębie-Zdrój, Silesian Voivodeship, Poland; 49°58′01″N 018°33′50″E
- Products: Coal
- Production: 3,950,000
- Opened: 1994
- Company: Jastrzębska Spółka Węglowa

The Jas-Mos coal mine is a large mine in the south of Poland in Jastrzębie-Zdrój, Silesian Voivodeship, 260 km south-west of the capital, Warsaw. Jas-Mos represents one of the largest coal reserve in Poland having estimated reserves of 34.1 million tonnes of coal. The annual coal production is around 3.95 million tonnes.
