= Ogorzelec, Polkowice County =

Ogorzelec
- Village
- Location within Poland
- Coordinates: 51°36′18″N 16°07′49″E
- Country: Poland
- Voivodeship: Lower Silesian
- County: Polkowice
- Gmina: Grębocice

Ogorzelec [ɔɡɔˈʐɛlɛt͡s] (German: Görlitz) is a village in the administrative district of Gmina Grębocice, within Polkowice County, Lower Silesian Voivodeship, in south-western Poland.
