= Tomisławice, Greater Poland Voivodeship =

Tomisławice
- Village
- Location within Poland
- Coordinates: 52°29′N 18°30′E
- Country: Poland
- Voivodeship: Greater Poland
- County: Konin
- Gmina: Wierzbinek

Tomisławice [tɔmiswaˈvit͡sɛ] is a village in the administrative district of Gmina Wierzbinek, within Konin County, Greater Poland Voivodeship, in west-central Poland.
