= Trzcianka Coal Deposit =

Trzcianka coal deposit
- Location: Trzcianka, Greater Poland Voivodeship, Poland
- Products: Lignite
- Production: none

The Trzcianka coal deposit is a lignite deposit in the north-west of Poland in Trzcianka, Greater Poland Voivodeship, 127 km north-west of the capital, Warsaw. The Trzcianka deposit has estimated reserves of 142 million tonnes of coal. In 2010, the Greater Poland Voivodeship Sejmik decided not to develop the Trzcianka deposit. As of 2020, there was no mining activity on the Trzcianka deposit.
