= Myszków mine =

Copper mine in Myszków, Myszków County, Poland

- Location within Poland
- Location: Myszków, Myszków County, Poland; 50°37′0.01″N 19°22′0.01″E
- Products: Copper, Molybdenum, Tungsten
- Opened: 2009
- Company: Strzelecki Metals

The Myszków mine is a large mine in the centre of Poland in Myszków, Myszków County, 258 km south-west of the capital, Warsaw. Myszków represents one of the largest copper and silver reserve in Poland having estimated reserves of 1,334 million tonnes of ore grading 0.15% copper and 2.37 g/tonnes silver. The 1.334 billion tonnes of ore contains 2 million tonnes of copper metal and around 3,200 tonnes of silver but the deposit also grades 0.07% molybdenum that contains 934,000 tonnes of molybdenum metal and 0.05% tungsten that contains 667,000 tonnes of tungsten metal.
