= Bytom Odrzański mine =

Copper mine in Poland

- Location within Poland
- Location: Bytom Odrzański, Nowa Sól County, Poland; 51°43′50.23″N 15°49′25.03″E
- Products: Copper
- Opened: 2004
- Company: KGHM Polska Miedź

The Bytom Odrzański mine is a large mine in the west of Poland in Bytom Odrzański, Nowa Sól County, 360 km south-west of the capital, Warsaw. Bytom Odrzański represents one of the largest copper and silver reserve in Poland having estimated reserves of 31.5 million tonnes of ore grading 2.47% copper and 56 g/tonnes silver. The annual ore production is around 0.7 million tonnes from which 17,300 tonnes of copper and 39.2 tonnes of silver are extracted.
