= Jóźwin, Gmina Kazimierz Biskupi =

Jóźwin
- Village
- Location within Poland
- Coordinates: 52°20′18″N 18°13′34″E
- Country: Poland
- Voivodeship: Greater Poland
- County: Konin
- Gmina: Kazimierz Biskupi

Jóźwin [ˈjuʑvin] is a village in the administrative district of Gmina Kazimierz Biskupi, within Konin County, Greater Poland Voivodeship, in west-central Poland.
