= Kompania Węglowa =

Polish coal mining company

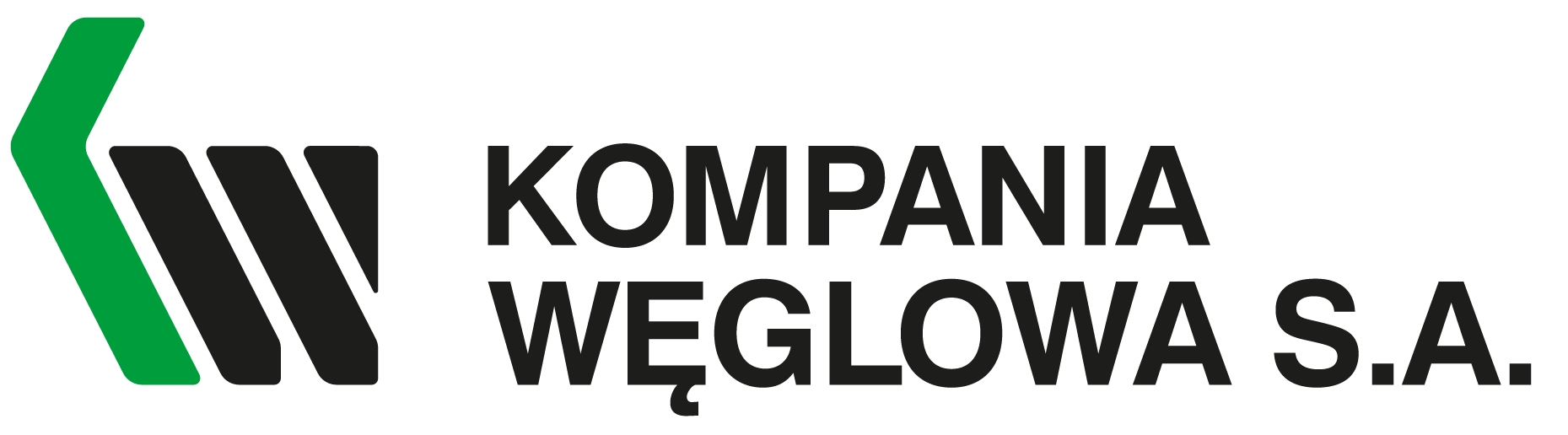
- Company type: National holding
- Industry: Mining
- Founded: 2016
- Headquarters: Katowice, Poland
- Key people: CEO
- Products: coal
- Revenue: US$ 3.4 billion (2007)
- Number of employees: 63,800 (2007)

Kompania Węglowa S.A. is the largest coal mining company in Poland and in Europe, producing around 48 million tonnes of coal every year from 23 mines.

== History ==
On July 12, 1990, the State Coal Agency Joint Stock Company was established from the dissolved Coal Community (WWK). It was renamed the State Agency for Hard Coal Mining Restructuring on July 12, 1996, and became Kompania Węglowa on December 30, 2002. The company’s branding was created by Rafał Bogusławski with A.R. Promix. Since April 29, 2016, Polska Grupa Górnicza has managed coal extraction based on Kompania Węglowa’s assets.

== Restructuring ==
On January 7, 2015, the Council of Ministers approved Kompania Węglowa’s restructuring plan, transferring four mines to the Mine Restructuring Company and moving nine others into a new special-purpose entity under Węglokoks SA. KWK Piekary was also sold to Węglokoks. In May 2015, Kompania Węglowa transferred three mines to SRK and sold two others to Węglokoks Kraj.

In September 2015, the Ministry of State Treasury delayed the formation of New Kompania Węglowa due to EU concerns over possible unauthorized state aid. On September 30, 2015, Kompania Węglowa’s shares were transferred to Towarzystwo Finansowe Silesia.
