= Economy of Poland =

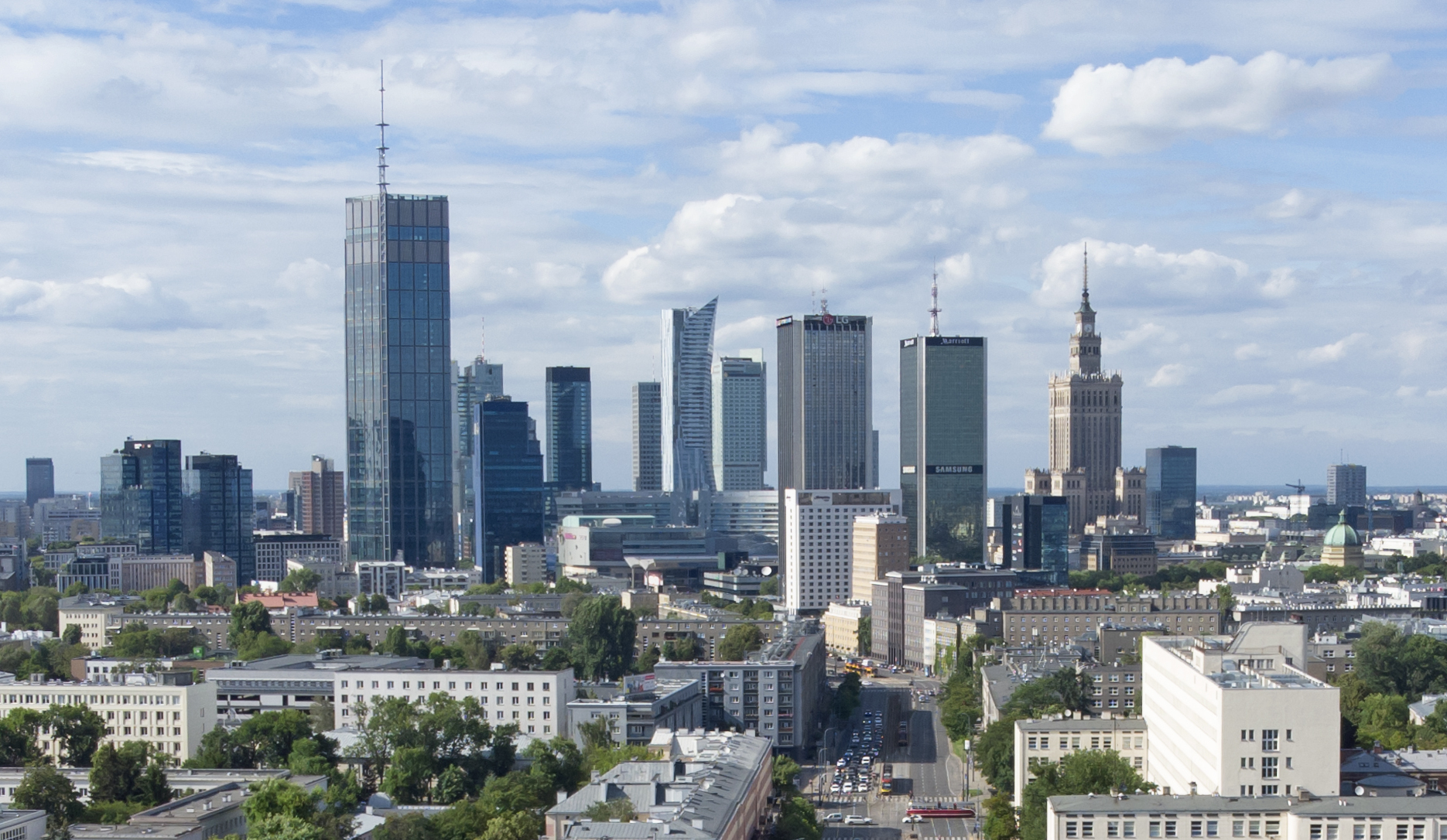
- Warsaw, central business district
- Currency: Polish złoty (PLN, zł)
- Fiscal year: Calendar year
- Trade organisations: EU, WTO and OECD
- Country group: Developing/Emerging; High-income economy; Diversified European (EU, non-EA) economy; Welfare state

Statistics
- Population: ▼36,497,495 (2025)
- GDP: ▲$1.13 trillion (nominal, 2026); ▲$2.16 trillion (PPP, 2026)
- GDP rank: 21st (nominal, 2026); 22nd (PPP, 2026)
- GDP growth: ▲3.0% (2024); ▲3.6% (2025); ▲3.3% (2026)
- GDP per capita: ▲$31,186 (nominal, 2026); ▲$59,790 (PPP, 2026)
- GDP per capita rank: 43rd (nominal, 2026); 35th (PPP, 2026)
- GDP per capita growth: 3.9% (real, 2025)
- GDP by sector: Agriculture: 2.9%; Industry: 28.7%; Services: 58.8%; (2023 est.)
- Inflation (CPI): 3.7% (2024); 4.3% (2025); 3.4% (2026)
- Population below national poverty line: ▼11.8% (2022); ▲16.3% at risk of poverty or social exclusion (2023)
- Gini coefficient: ▼26.0 low (2024)
- Human Development Index: ▲0.906 very high (2023) (35th); ▲0.817 very high IHDI (2023) (35th)
- Corruption Perceptions Index: ▲52 out of 100 points (2024, 53rd rank)
- Labour force: ▲18,387,400 (2023); ▲77.9% employment rate (2023)
- Labour force by occupation: Agriculture: 6.0%; Industry: 30.2%; Services: 63.8%; (2025)
- Unemployment: ▲3.1% (2025)
- Youth unemployment: 10.7% (2025)
- Average gross salary: 11,187 zł / €2,567 monthly (August 2026)
- Average net salary: 8,026 zł / €1,842 monthly (August 2026)
- Main industries: Machine building; iron and steel; mining coal; chemicals; ship building; food processing; furniture; glass; beverages; video games; textiles

External
- Exports: ▲$478.579 billion (2024 est.)
- Export goods: Vehicle parts/accessories, electric batteries, plastic products, cars, seats (2023)
- Main export partners: Germany 27.8%; Czech Republic 6.6%; France 5.7%; United Kingdom 4.9%; Italy 4.6%; (2022)
- Imports: ▲$441.945 billion (2024 est.)
- Import goods: Crude petroleum, cars, garments, vehicle parts/accessories, plastic products (2023)
- Main import partners: Germany 20.2%; China 14.7%; Italy 4.6%; United States 4.3%; Russia 4.3%; (2022)
- FDI stock: ▲$282.6 billion (31 December 2017 est.); ▲ Abroad: $72.87 billion (31 December 2017 est.)
- Current account: ▲$1.584 billion (2017 est.)
- Gross external debt: ▼$241 billion (31 December 2017 est.)

Public finance
- Government debt: 49.6% of GDP (2023); PLN 1.7 trillion (2023)
- Foreign reserves: ▲$193.783 billion (2023 est.)
- Budget balance: PLN 174 billion deficit (2023); −5.1% of GDP (2023)
- Revenue: 41.6% of GDP (2023)
- Spending: 46.7% of GDP (2023)
- Economic aid: €67 billion from European Structural and Investment Funds (2007–2013); €86 billion from European Structural and Investment Funds (2014–2020)
- Credit rating: Standard & Poor's: A− (Domestic); A− (Foreign); A (T&C Assessment); Outlook: Stable; Moody's: A2; Outlook: Stable; Fitch: A−; Outlook: Negative; Scope: A; Outlook: Stable
- All values, unless otherwise stated, are in US dollars.

Poland has a high-income, industrialized social market economy that is the sixth-largest in the European Union by nominal GDP and fifth-largest by PPP-adjusted GDP. A developed market, Poland has the extensive public services characteristic of most developed economies and is one of few countries in Europe to require no tuition fees for undergraduate and postgraduate education and with universal public healthcare that is free at a point of use. Since 1988, Poland has pursued a policy of economic liberalisation but retained an advanced public welfare system. It ranks 20th worldwide in terms of PPP-adjusted GDP, 20th in terms of nominal GDP, and 21st in the 2023 Economic Complexity Index. Among OECD nations, Poland has a highly efficient and strong social security system; social expenditure stood at roughly 22.7% of GDP.

The largest component of Poland's economy is the service sector (62.3%), followed by industry (34.2%) and agriculture (3.5%). Following the economic reform of 1989, Poland's external debt has increased from $42.2 billion in 1989 to $365.2 billion in 2014. Poland shipped US$224.6 billion worth of goods around the globe in 2017, while exports increased to US$221.4 billion. The country's top export goods include machinery, electronic equipment, vehicles, furniture, and plastics. Poland was the only economy in the EU to avoid a recession during the 2008 financial crisis.

As of 2019, the Polish economy had been developing steadily for 28 years, a record high in the EU. This record was only surpassed by Australia in the world economy. GDP per capita at purchasing power parity has grown on average by 6% p.a. over the last 20 years, the highest in Central Europe. Poland's GDP has increased seven-fold since 1990. Poland's nominal GDP has increased by 500% since 2000. The country became a one trillion dollar economy in September 2025.

== History ==
Poland has seen the largest increase in GDP per capita (more than 100%) both among the former Eastern Bloc countries, and compared to the EU-15 (around 45%). It has had uninterrupted economic growth since 1992, even after the 2008 financial crisis.

=== Before 1989 ===
This article discusses the economy of post-1989 Poland. For a historical overview see:

- Economy of the Polish–Lithuanian Commonwealth (1569–1795)
- Economy of the Second Polish Republic (1918–1939)
- Economy of the People's Republic of Poland (1945–1989)

=== 1990–2009 ===
The Polish state steadfastly pursued a policy of economic liberalization throughout the 1990s, with positive results for economic growth but negative results for some sectors of the population. The privatization of small and medium state-owned companies and a liberal law on establishing new firms has encouraged the development of the private business sector, which has been the main drive for Poland's economic growth. The agricultural sector remained constrained by structural problems, surplus labour, inefficient small farms, and a lack of investment. Restructuring and privatization of "sensitive sectors" (e.g. coal), has also been slow, but foreign investments in energy and steel have begun to turn the tide. Also, reforms in healthcare, education, the pension system, and state administration have resulted in larger than expected fiscal pressures. Improving this account deficit and tightening monetary policy, with a focus on inflation, are priorities for the Polish government. Further progress in public finance depends mainly on the reduction of public sector employment, and an overhaul of the tax code to incorporate farmers, who currently pay significantly lower taxes than other people with similar income levels.

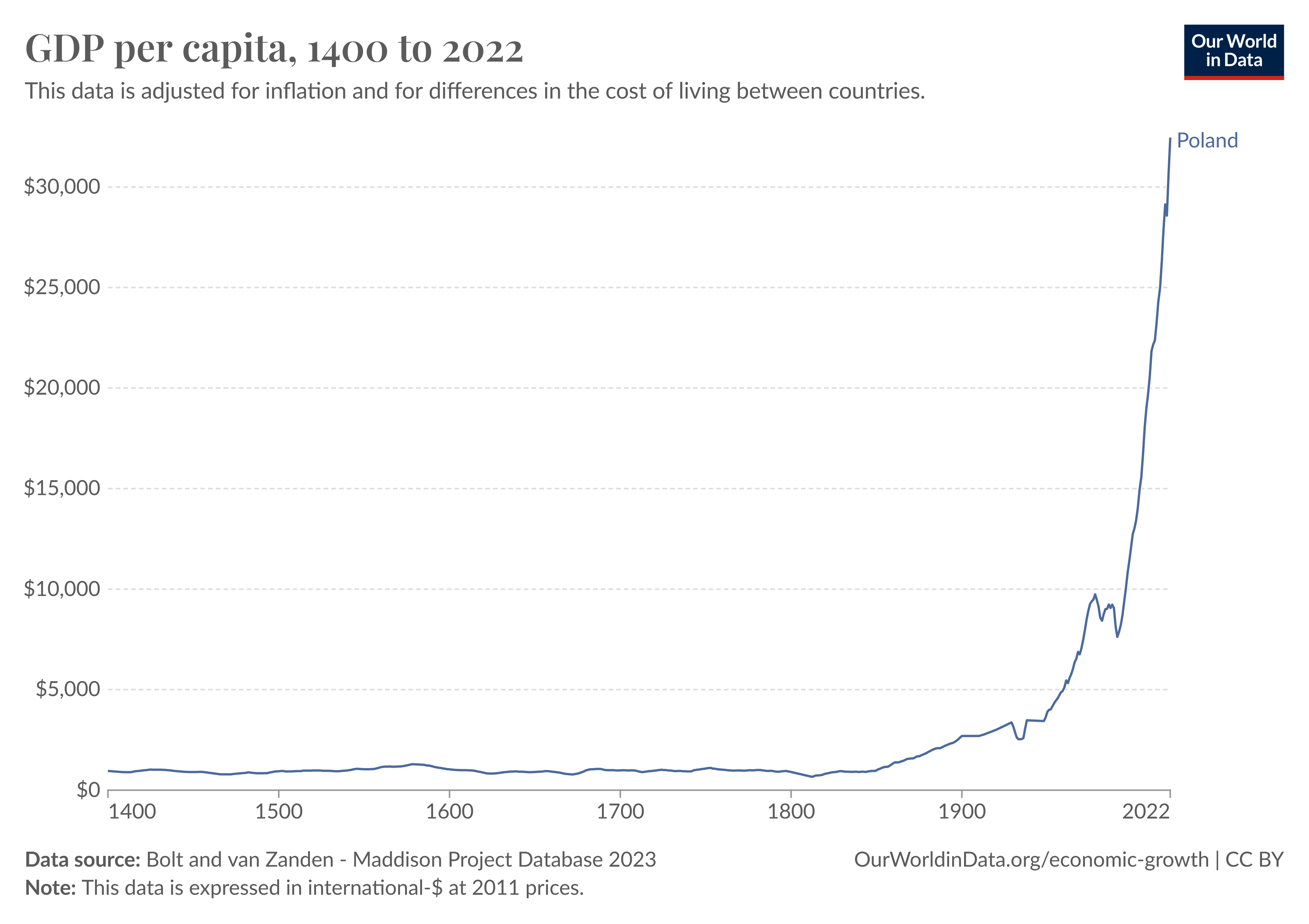
Estimated historical development of real GDP per capita in Poland (1400–2022)

=== 2008 financial crisis and Great Recession ===
Since the Great Recession, Poland's GDP has continued to grow. In 2009, the GDP for the European Union as a whole dropped by 4.5% while Polish GDP increased by 1.6%. As of November 2013, the size of the EU's economy remains below the pre-crisis level, while Poland's economy increased by a cumulative 16%. The major reasons for its success appear to be a large internal market (in terms of population it is sixth in the EU) and a business-friendly political climate. The economic reforms implemented after the fall of communism in the 1990s have also played a role; between 1989 and 2007 Poland's economy grew by 177%, faster than other countries in Eastern and Central Europe, while at the same time millions were left without work.

However, the economic fluctuations of the business cycle did affect Poland's unemployment rate, which by early 2013 reached almost 11%. This level was still below European average and has begun falling subsequently. As of October 2017, Poland's unemployment rate stood at 4.6% according to Eurostat.

== Economic growth ==
In 2018, the Polish economy grew by 5.1% compared to 4.8% in 2017. Economic growth in the fourth quarter of 2018 in Poland amounted to 4.9% on an annual basis and compared to the third quarter, where GDP increased by 5.1%, it was slightly lower. During this period, investments increased by 6.7%, private consumption also increased by 4.3%, and domestic demand increased by 4.8%. The PMI index in January 2019 was 48.2 points and was higher than in December 2018 when it amounted to 47.6 points.

Analysts have attributed the robust health of Polish economic growth to its size and geopolitical importance, post-Soviet structural reforms, low taxes and low state debt, and the fact that it developed a significant private-sector economy while it was part of the Eastern Bloc.

Recent GDP growth (comparing to the same quarter of previous year):

| Year | Q1 | Q2 | Q3 | Q4 | Overall |
|---|---|---|---|---|---|
| 2026 | 3.5% | 3.8% | | | |
| 2025 | 3.8% | 3.0% | 4.0% | 3.6% | 3.6% |
| 2024 | 1.7% | 3.9% | 2.1% | 3.9% | 2.9% |
| 2023 | -1.2% | -0.7% | 0.6% | 1.9% | 0.2% |
| 2022 | 10.3% | 6.3% | 4.8% | 1.0% | 5.3% |
| 2021 | -0.6% | 12.0% | 7.3% | 9.2% | 6.9% |
| 2020 | 2.0% | -8.3% | -1.7% | -2.7% | -2.2% |
| 2019 | 5.5% | 5.4% | 4.6% | 3.7% | 4.8% |
| 2018 | 5.2% | 5.3% | 5.2% | 4.9% | 5.2% |
| 2017 | 4.6% | 4.3% | 5.5% | 5.1% | 4.9% |
| 2016 | 3.1% | 3.4% | 2.8% | 2.8% | 3.0% |
| 2015 | 3.8% | 3.3% | 3.6% | 4.6% | 3.8% |
| 2014 | 3.1% | 3.3% | 3.4% | 3.3% | 3.3% |
| 2013 | 0.1% | 0.6% | 1.9% | 2.7% | 1.3% |
| 2012 | 3.3% | 2.3% | 1.0% | 0.2% | 1.7% |
| 2011 | 4.9% | 4.8% | 5.0% | 5.3% | 5.0% |
| 2010 | 2.1% | 3.6% | 4.0% | 4.8% | 3.6% |
| 2009 | 1.5% | 1.9% | 2.7% | 4.2% | 2.6% |
| 2008 | 5.5% | 4.9% | 3.7% | 1.9% | 4.0% |
| 2007 | 7.7% | 7.3% | 6.9% | 6.9% | 7.2% |
| 2006 | 5.6% | 6.3% | 6.5% | 6.3% | 6.2% |
| 2005 | 2.2% | 2.8% | 4.3% | 4.8% | 3.5% |
| 2004 | 7.0% | 5.7% | 4.6% | 3.6% | 5.2% |
| 2003 | 1.8% | 3.6% | 4.0% | 4.6% | 3.5% |
| 2002 | 0.6% | 0.9% | 1.9% | 2.2% | 1.4% |
| 2001 | 2.4% | 1.2% | 1.0% | 0.5% | 1.3% |
| 2000 | 6.1% | 5.4% | 3.3% | 2.7% | 4.4% |
| 1999 | 2.2% | 3.5% | 5.4% | 6.6% | 4.4% |
| 1998 | 6.6% | 5.4% | 5.0% | 3.2% | 5.1% |
| 1997 | 7.1% | 7.7% | 7.0% | 6.6% | 7.1% |
| 1996 | 3.5% | 5.7% | 7.4% | 8.1% | 6.2% |

== Currency ==
The złoty (alternative spelling: zloty; Polish: polski złoty, pronounced [ˈzwɔtɨ]; (Note: The nominative plural, used for numbers ending in 2, 3 and 4 (except those in 12, 13 and 14), is złote [ˈzwɔtɛ]; the genitive plural, used for all other numbers, is złotych [ˈzwɔtɨx]) abbreviation: zł; code: PLN), (Note: Prior to 1995, code PLZ was used instead.) is the official currency and legal tender of Poland. It is subdivided into 100 groszy (gr). (Note: Singular: grosz, alternative plural forms: groszy, grosze.) It is the most-traded currency in Central and Eastern Europe and ranks 20th most-traded in the foreign exchange market.

The word złoty is a masculine form of the Polish adjective 'golden', which closely relates with its name to the guilder, whereas the grosz subunit is based on the groschen, cognate to the English word groat. It was officially introduced to replace its interim predecessor, the Polish marka, on 28 February 1919 and began circulation in 1924. The only bodies permitted to manufacture or mint złoty coins and banknotes are the Polish Security Printing Works, founded in Warsaw on 25 January 1919, and Mennica Polska, founded in Warsaw on 10 February 1766.

As a result of inflation in the early 1990s, the currency underwent redenomination. Thus, on 1 January 1995, 10,000 old złoty (PLZ) became one new złoty (PLN). As a member of the European Union, Poland is obliged to adopt the euro when all specific conditions are met; however, there is no time limit for fulfilling all of them. (See Poland and the euro.)

Currently, Poland is not in the European Exchange Rate Mechanism (ERM II).

== Budget, debt and government finances ==
Public debt level of Poland in % of GDP

The public and private debt levels of Poland are below the European average (2017).

Taxes in Poland are levied by both the central and local governments. Tax revenue in Poland is 33.9% of the country's GDP in 2017. The most important revenue sources include the income tax, Social Security, corporate tax and the value added tax, which are all applied on the national level.

Income earned is generally subject to a progressive income tax, which applies to all who are in the workforce. For the year 2014, two different tax rates on income apply.

In Poland, people with the highest incomes are required to pay a solidarity levy, often referred to as the third tax bracket. It amounts to 4% on annual income exceeding 1,000,000 PLN. The funds collected are allocated to the Solidarity Support Fund for Disabled Persons.

== Location ==
Poland has been considered a convenient location for transporting components and products throughout Europe from other parts of the world, and electronics and automotive manufacturers in Asia have increased their operations in Poland since supply chains in China were disrupted by the COVID-19 pandemic. This type of transfer of business processes to a country geographically closer to customers and consumers has been called "nearshoring."

== Data ==
The following table shows the main economic indicators in 1980–2024 (with IMF staff estimates in 2024–2030). Inflation under 5% is in green.

| Year | GDP (in Bil. PLN) | GDP (in Bil. US $PPP) | GDP per capita (in US$ PPP) | GDP (in Bil. US$ nominal) | GDP per capita (in US$ nominal) | GDP growth (real) | Inflation rate (in percent) | Unemployment (in percent) | Government debt (in % of GDP) |
|---|---|---|---|---|---|---|---|---|---|
| 1980 | 0.3 | 171.6 | 4,823.8 | 56.7 | 1,595.0 | ▼ -6.0% | ▲9.4% | —N/a | |
| 1981 | ▲0.3 | ▼169.0 | ▼4,709.8 | ▼53.8 | ▼1,497.8 | ▼ -10.0% | ▲21.2% | —N/a | |
| 1982 | ▲0.6 | ▲170.8 | ▲4,715.1 | ▲65.3 | ▲1,803.5 | ▼ -4.8% | ▲100.8% | —N/a | |
| 1983 | ▲0.7 | ▲187.4 | ▲5,101.7 | ▲75.6 | ▲2,057.0 | ▲5.6% | ▲22.1% | —N/a | |
| 1984 | ▲0.9 | ▲193.4 | ▲5,221.3 | ▲75.7 | ▼2,042.0 | ▼ -0.4% | ▲75.6% | —N/a | |
| 1985 | ▲1.0 | ▲207.3 | ▲5,552.7 | ▼70.9 | ▼1,899.8 | ▲3.9% | ▲15.1% | —N/a | |
| 1986 | ▲1.3 | ▲218.8 | ▲5,826.4 | ▲73.8 | ▲1,965.5 | ▲3.5% | ▲17.8% | —N/a | |
| 1987 | ▲1.7 | ▲229.4 | ▲6,076.9 | ▼63.8 | ▼1,691.1 | ▲2.3% | ▲25.2% | —N/a | |
| 1988 | ▲3.0 | ▲245.3 | ▲6,491.7 | ▲68.7 | ▲1,819.4 | ▲3.3% | ▲60.2% | —N/a | |
| 1989 | ▲9.6 | ▲264.6 | ▲6,996.4 | ▼67.0 | ▼1,772.1 | ▲3.8% | ▲251.1% | —N/a | |
| 1990 | ▲60.0 | ▼254.8 | ▼6,673.9 | ▼62.2 | ▼1,629.0 | ▼ -7.2% | ▲585.8% | 6.3% | —N/a |
| 1991 | ▲85.3 | ▼245.0 | ▼6,399.5 | ▲80.6 | ▲2,105.5 | ▼ -7.0% | ▲70.3% | ▲11.8% | —N/a |
| 1992 | ▲121.2 | ▲255.7 | ▲6,661.0 | ▲88.9 | ▲2,315.6 | ▲2.0% | ▲43.0% | ▲13.6% | —N/a |
| 1993 | ▲164.3 | ▲273.0 | ▲7,089.9 | ▲90.5 | ▲2,351.7 | ▲4.3% | ▲35.3% | ▲16.4% | —N/a |
| 1994 | ▲236.1 | ▲293.4 | ▲7,604.9 | ▲103.9 | ▲2,692.7 | ▲5.2% | ▲32.2% | ▼11.4% | —N/a |
| 1995 | ▲337.9 | ▲319.7 | ▲8,286.8 | ▲139.4 | ▲3,612.3 | ▲6.7% | ▲27.9% | ▲13.3% | 48.7% |
| 1996 | ▲423.3 | ▲345.9 | ▲8,958.4 | ▲157.0 | ▲4,066.2 | ▲6.2% | ▲19.9% | ▼12.3% | ▼43.1% |
| 1997 | ▲516.4 | ▲376.8 | ▲9,751.0 | ▲157.5 | ▲4,076.0 | ▲7.1% | ▲14.9% | ▼11.2% | ▼42.7% |
| 1998 | ▲602.1 | ▲400.0 | ▲10,346.5 | ▲172.4 | ▲4,459.1 | ▲5.0% | ▲11.8% | ▼10.6% | ▼38.7% |
| 1999 | ▲667.0 | ▲424.0 | ▲10,965.0 | ▼168.1 | ▼4,348.1 | ▲4.5% | ▲7.3% | ▲13.1% | ▲39.3% |
| 2000 | ▲745.8 | ▲452.1 | ▲11,814.4 | ▲171.6 | ▲4,485.1 | ▲4.3% | ▲10.1% | ▲16.1% | ▼36.4% |
| 2001 | ▲781.1 | ▲467.8 | ▲12,229.2 | ▲190.8 | ▲4,987.9 | ▲1.2% | ▲5.5% | ▲18.2% | ▲37.1% |
| 2002 | ▲812.2 | ▲482.0 | ▲12,602.9 | ▲199.1 | ▲5,205.5 | ▲1.4% | ▲1.9% | ▲20.2% | ▲41.5% |
| 2003 | ▲847.2 | ▲508.7 | ▲13,309.5 | ▲217.8 | ▲5,699.6 | ▲3.5% | ▲0.7% | ▼19.9% | ▲46.4% |
| 2004 | ▲933.1 | ▲548.4 | ▲14,358.3 | ▲255.3 | ▲6,684.7 | ▲5.0% | ▲3.5% | ▼19.3% | ▼45.1% |
| 2005 | ▲990.5 | ▲585.4 | ▲15,334.6 | ▲306.3 | ▲8,023.9 | ▲3.5% | ▲2.2% | ▼18.1% | ▲46.6% |
| 2006 | ▲1,069.4 | ▲640.4 | ▲16,784.3 | ▲344.6 | ▲9,031.8 | ▲6.1% | ▲1.2% | ▼14.2% | ▲47.3% |
| 2007 | ▲1,187.5 | ▲704.2 | ▲18,470.5 | ▲429.0 | ▲11,252.9 | ▲7.1% | ▲2.5% | ▼9.9% | ▼44.5% |
| 2008 | ▲1,285.6 | ▲747.8 | ▲19,620.4 | ▲533.6 | ▲13,999.5 | ▲4.2% | ▲4.3% | ▼7.5% | ▲46.7% |
| 2009 | ▲1,372.0 | ▲774.0 | ▲20,294.6 | ▼439.8 | ▼11,532.3 | ▲2.8% | ▲3.8% | ▲8.5% | ▲49.8% |
| 2010 | ▲1,434.4 | ▲812.6 | ▲21,370.1 | ▲479.8 | ▲12,619.6 | ▲3.7% | ▲2.6% | ▲10.0% | ▲53.5% |
| 2011 | ▲1,553.6 | ▲868.9 | ▲22,828.0 | ▲528.3 | ▲13,879.5 | ▲4.8% | ▲4.2% | ▼9.9% | ▲54.7% |
| 2012 | ▲1,612.7 | ▲903.8 | ▲23,745.3 | ▼498.5 | ▼13,096.9 | ▲1.3% | ▲3.7% | ▲10.4% | ▼54.4% |
| 2013 | ▲1,630.1 | ▲934.6 | ▲24,553.1 | ▲521.0 | ▲13,688.4 | ▲1.1% | ▲1.1% | ▲10.6% | ▲56.5% |
| 2014 | ▲1,700.6 | ▲968.4 | ▲25,471.4 | ▲542.6 | ▲14,272.3 | ▲3.4% | ▲0.1% | ▼9.2% | ▼51.1% |
| 2015 | ▲1,798.5 | ▲1,020.7 | ▲26,855.7 | ▼477.5 | ▼12,563.6 | ▲4.2% | ▲ -0.9% | ▼7.7% | ▲51.3% |
| 2016 | ▲1,853.2 | ▲1,075.3 | ▲28,321.4 | ▼472.3 | ▼12,438.5 | ▲3.1% | ▲ -0.7% | ▼6.3% | ▲54.2% |
| 2017 | ▲1,982.8 | ▲1,145.3 | ▲30,161.6 | ▲526.6 | ▲13,868.9 | ▲4.8% | ▲2.0% | ▼5.0% | ▼50.6% |
| 2018 | ▲2,126.5 | ▲1,235.5 | ▲32,532.2 | ▲587.4 | ▲15,468.3 | ▲5.9% | ▲1.8% | ▼3.9% | ▼48.8% |
| 2019 | ▲2,288.5 | ▲1,317.2 | ▲34,689.0 | ▲597.2 | ▲15,726.9 | ▲4.5% | ▲2.2% | ▼3.3% | ▼45.6% |
| 2020 | ▲2,337.7 | ▼1,303.8 | ▼34,347.9 | ▲599.8 | ▲15,801.6 | ▼ -2.0% | ▲3.4% | ▼3.2% | ▲57.1% |
| 2021 | ▲2,631.3 | ▲1,437.8 | ▲37,997.0 | ▲679.1 | ▲17,945.8 | ▲6.9% | ▲5.1% | ▲3.4% | ▼53.8% |
| 2022 | ▲3,100.9 | ▲1,742.0 | ▲47,222.0 | ▲695.7 | ▲18,859.8 | ▲5.3% | ▲14.4% | ▼2.8% | ▼48.8% |
| 2023 | ▲3,401.6 | ▲1,807.2 | ▲49,170.6 | ▲809.7 | ▲22,030.6 | ▲0.2% | ▲11.4% | 2.8% | ▲49.7% |
| 2024 | ▲3,617.5 | ▲1,903.7 | ▲51,983.4 | ▲908.6 | ▲24,810.4 | ▲2.9% | ▲3.6% | 2.8% | ▲55.3% |
| 2025 | ▲3,886.1 | ▲2,017.5 | ▲55,185.6 | ▲980.0 | ▲26,805.1 | ▲3.2% | ▲4.3% | ▲2.9% | ▲60.7% |
| 2026 | ▲4,146.1 | ▲2,125.5 | ▲58,254.5 | ▲1,040.6 | ▲28,520.7 | ▲3.1% | ▲3.4% | ▲3.0% | ▲64.3% |
| 2027 | ▲4,393.0 | ▲2,230.5 | ▲61,253.3 | ▲1,102.2 | ▲30,268.1 | ▲3.0% | ▲2.9% | 3.0% | ▲65.7% |
| 2028 | ▲4,636.3 | ▲2,343.8 | ▲64,495.3 | ▲1,167.0 | ▲32,112.4 | ▲2.9% | ▲2.6% | ▲3.2% | ▲66.8% |
| 2029 | ▲4,887.3 | ▲2,454.2 | ▲67,666.7 | ▲1,234.5 | ▲34,038.0 | ▲2.8% | ▲2.5% | ▲3.3% | ▲67.2% |
| 2030 | ▲5,147.3 | ▲2,568.6 | ▲70,962.8 | ▲1,305.0 | ▲36,052.6 | ▲2.7% | 2.5% | ▲3.4% | ▲67.7% |

== Sectors ==
As of 2024, the Polish economy is dominated by the services sector, with 615,647 registered companies, followed by 329,255 companies in finance, insurance, and real estate and 176,149 companies in retail trade.

=== Agriculture, fishing, livestock and forestry ===
Agriculture employs 8.2% of the workforce but contributes 3.8% to GDP, reflecting relatively low productivity. Unlike the industrial sector, Poland's agricultural sector remained largely in private hands during the Polish People's Republic. Most of the former state farms are now leased to farmer tenants. Lack of credit is hampering efforts to sell former state farmland. Currently, Poland's 2 million private farms occupy 90% of all farmland and account for roughly the same percentage of total agricultural production. Farms are small—8 hectares on average—and often fragmented. Farms with an area exceeding 15 ha accounted for 9% of the total number of farms but cover 45% of total agricultural area. Over half of all farm households in Poland produce only for their own needs with little, if any, commercial sales.

Poland is a net exporter of processed fruit and vegetables, meat, and dairy products. Processors often rely on imports to supplement domestic supplies of wheat, feed grains, vegetable oil, and protein meals, which are generally insufficient to meet domestic demand. However, Poland is the leading EU producer of potatoes and rye and is one of the world's largest producers of sugar beets and triticale. Poland is also a significant producer of rapeseed, grains, hogs, and cattle. Poland is the sixth-largest producer and exporter of apples in the entire world.

Aquaculture in Poland is exclusively freshwater-based, producing around 38,000 to 40,000 tonnes of fish annually. Poland is also one of the top seafood-processing hubs in the European Union, shipping roughly 80% of its processed products to Western markets like Germany, Denmark and Italy.

Poland's livestock sector is a major powerhouse in the European Union, anchored by a dominant €5 billion poultry industry, large dairy and cattle production and a restructured pig-farming sector. The sector is heavily export-oriented, driven by large agro-industrial groups alongside traditional family holdings.

=== Industrial and manufacturing ===
Before World War II, Poland's industrial base was concentrated in the coal, textile, chemical, machinery, iron, and steel sectors. Today it extends to fertilizers, petrochemicals, machine tools, electrical machinery, electronics, car manufacturing, and shipbuilding.

Poland's industrial base suffered greatly during World War II, and many resources were directed toward reconstruction. The socialist economic system imposed in the late 1940s created large and unwieldy economic structures operated under a tight central command. In part because of this systemic rigidity, the economy performed poorly even in comparison with other economies in Central Europe.

In 1990, the Tadeusz Mazowiecki government began a comprehensive reform programme to replace the centralised command economy with a market-oriented system. While the results overall have been impressive, many large state-owned industrial enterprises, particularly the rail, mining, steel, and defence sectors, have remained resistant to change and the downsizing required to survive in a market-based economy.

==== Automobile ====
The automobile industry in Poland makes up a sizeable part of the Polish economy, accounting for about 11% of Poland's industrial production. Poland is one of the largest producer of light vehicles (passenger cars) in Central and Eastern Europe. As of 2024 Poland was the 25th largest automaker in the world.

==== Chemical ====
Chemical industry in Poland - one of the key branches of the processing industry which includes:

- organic chemistry industry – manufactures products on the basis of carbohydrates, wood, rubber, fats and other organic substances,
- non-organic chemistry industry – products manufactured on the basis of non-organic substances, e.g. minerals and ores.

Chemical industry in terms of tons of production can be divided into:

- great chemistry - the name refers to the production size of millions tons a year; great chemistry includes the production of fertilisers, fuels, plastics (mainly plasticisers) and industrial gases;
- small chemistry - production on a smaller scale - dozens of tons; this sector includes mainly chemistry with high added value and more expensive production, e.g. medicaments, cosmetics, cleaning agents;
- chemical processing - processing finished half-products: by mixing, packing, thermal treatment and other methods.

Chemical industry is characteristic of the high capital intensity and low labour consumption, for this reason, the most of operations are automated.

==== Defense ====
Poland's defense industry is rapidly expanding, fueled by military modernization programs, regional security dynamics and financing through the Security Action for Europe (SAFE) fund. The sector is anchored by state-owned conglomerate Polska Grupa Zbrojeniowa (PGZ) and private innovators such as WB Group, which is scaling up domestic manufacturing of ammunition, armored vehicles and artillery.

==== Iron and steel ====
Poland produces roughly 7.1 million tonnes of crude steel annually across six main metallurgical enterprises, led by ArcelorMittal Poland. However, the industry faces severe structural challenges from high energy costs and heavy import competition.

==== Pharmaceuticals ====
The pharmaceutical market is worth 50 billion PLN as of 2023, an increase of 9.5% over the previous year.

The non-prescription medicine market, which accounts for about one-third of the total market value, was worth PLN 7.5bn in 2008. This value includes drugs and non-drugs such as dietary supplements, cosmetics, dressings, dental materials, diagnostic tests, and medical devices. The prescription medicines market was worth PLN 15.8bn.

==== Mining ====
As of 2023, the country was the world's 3rd largest producer of rhenium, 5th largest producer of silver, the 13th largest producer of copper, the 14th largest producer of sulfur, and the 14th largest producer of salt.

=== Energy ===
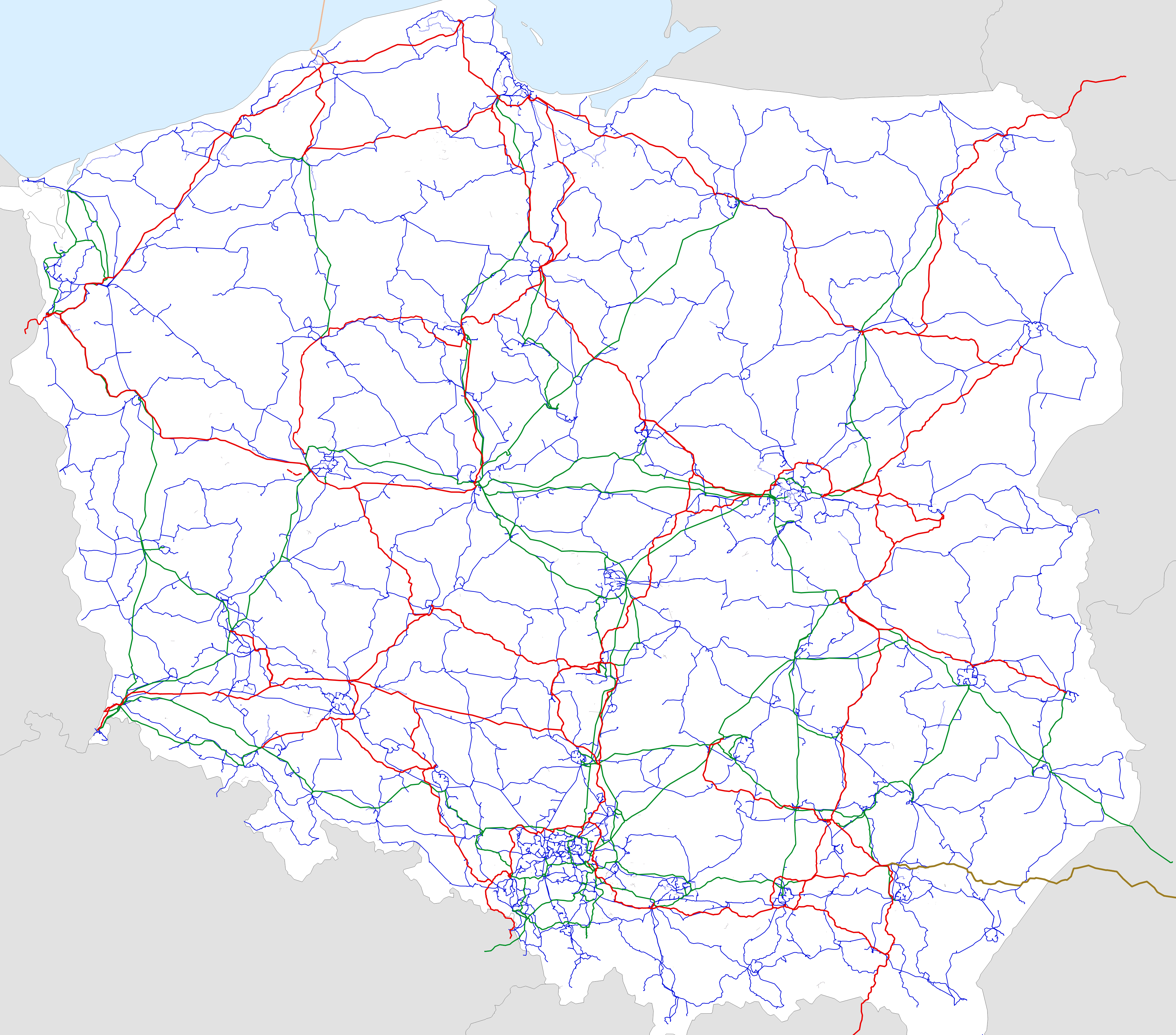
400/220/110 kV power grid lines in 2022

The Polish energy sector is the fifth largest in Europe. In recent years, Poland has been reducing its reliance on coal, increasing its wind and solar power capacity, and introducing nuclear power to diversify its energy mix and reduce carbon emissions. In 2023, solar energy expanded by 51.39%, followed by a 26.61% increase in 2024. Meanwhile, hard coal saw a significant decline, dropping by 16.96% in 2024.

In 2025, renewable energy sources generated 54.7 TWh of electricity in Poland, accounting for 31.4% of total electricity production. Renewable sources also represented 50% of installed generation capacity at the end of the year.

==== Oil and gas ====
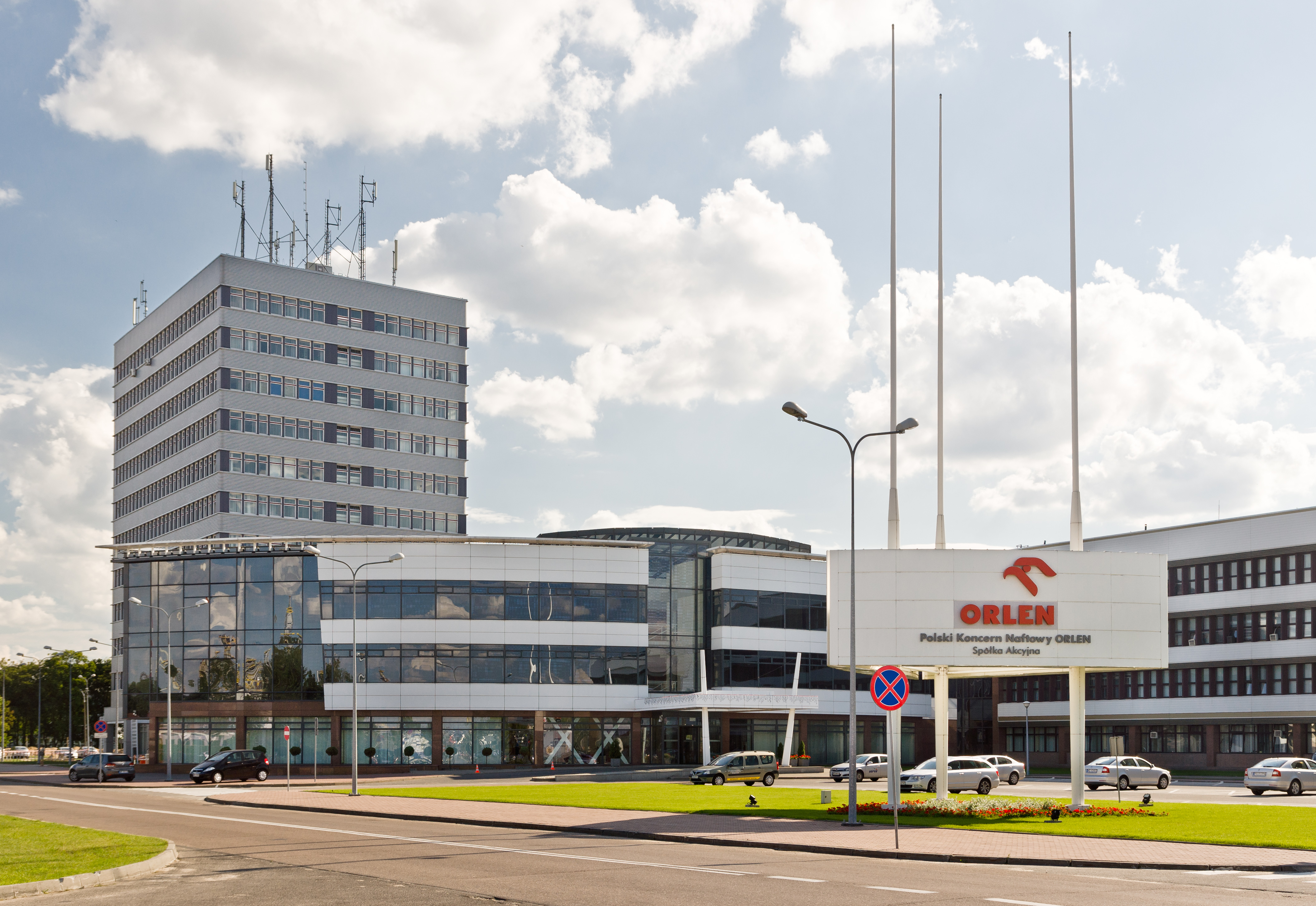
Orlen is among the largest companies in Europe.

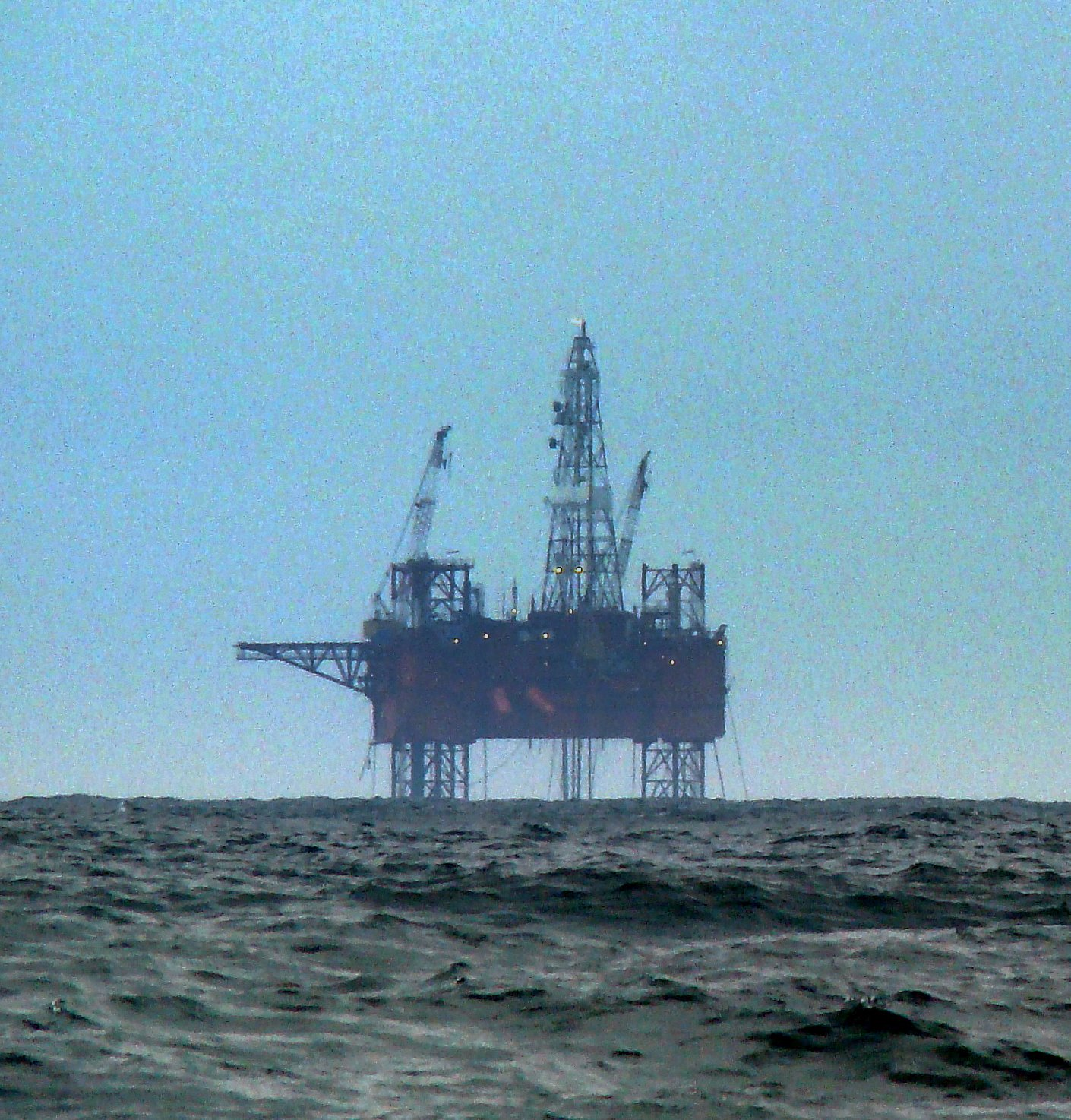
Baltic Beta

In addition to exploration for tight oil and shale gas by international firms there is a small Polish oil and gas industry with some oil and gas production:

- Polskie Górnictwo Naftowe i Gazownictwo (PGNiG, literally: Polish Petroleum and Gas Mining) is a Polish state-controlled oil and natural gas company, which deals with the exploration and production of natural gas and crude oil, natural gas import, storage and distribution and sales of natural gas and crude oil. PGNiG is one of the largest companies in Poland and is listed on the Warsaw Stock Exchange
- Przedsiębiorstwo Poszukiwań i Eksploatacji Złóż Ropy i Gazu "Petrobaltic" S.A. (Exploration and Mining of Petroleum and Gas Deposits Joint stock company "Petrobaltic") was set up in November 1990. On 1 January 1999, the firm was transformed in limited liability company and the only shareholder become the State Treasury. The company is the only firm in Poland performing exploration and production of crude oil and gas in the Baltic Sea. B3 oil field is currently in production and has a 2006 production of 1.9 million bbl/year. The company has its head office in Gdańsk. Exploration and exploitation of oil and gas deposits are performed with three drilling platforms: Petrobaltic, Baltic Beta and Jacket-type platform called "PG-1".

=== Services ===
==== Banking and finance ====
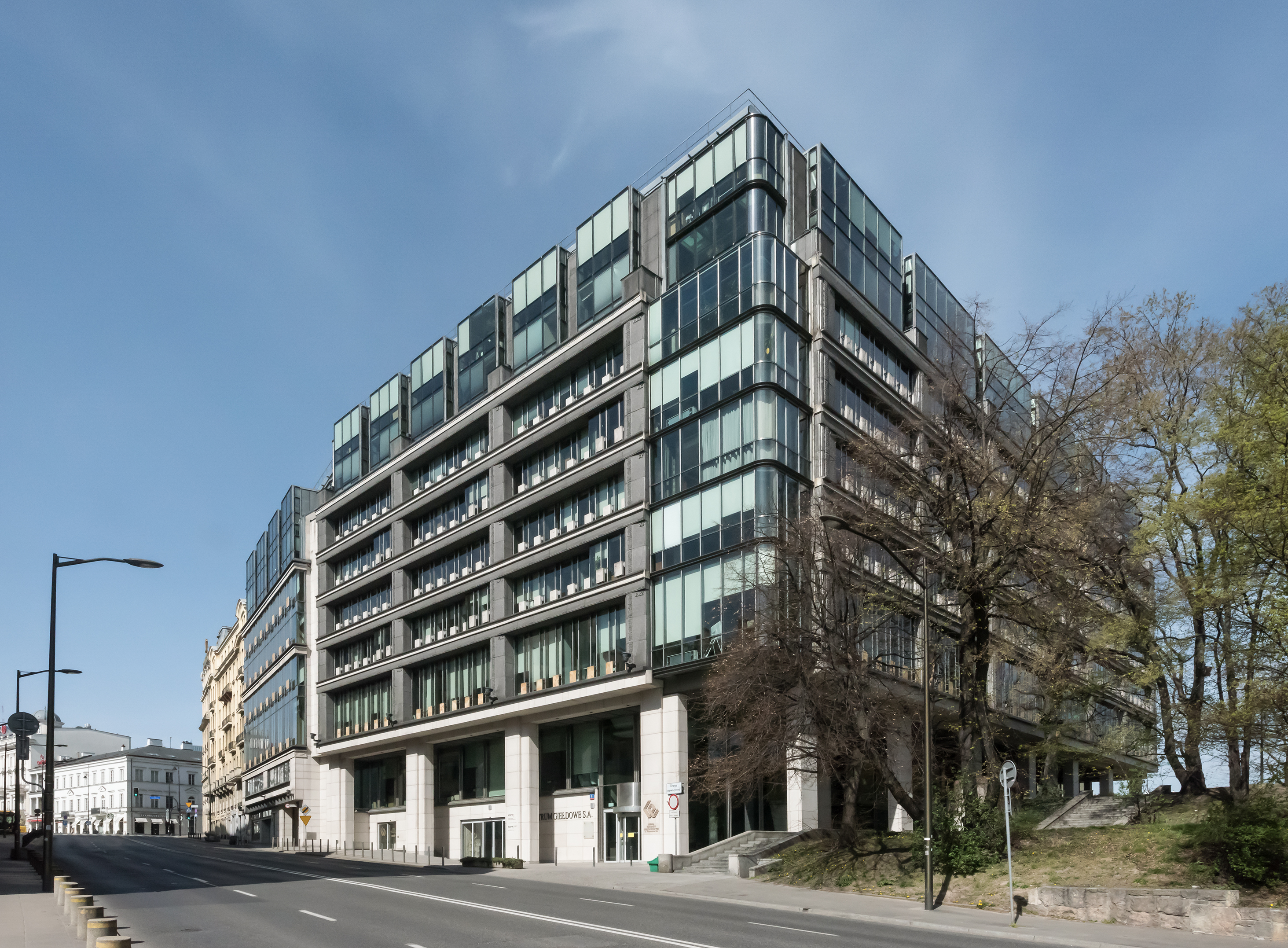
The Warsaw Stock Exchange is the largest stock exchange in Central Europe.

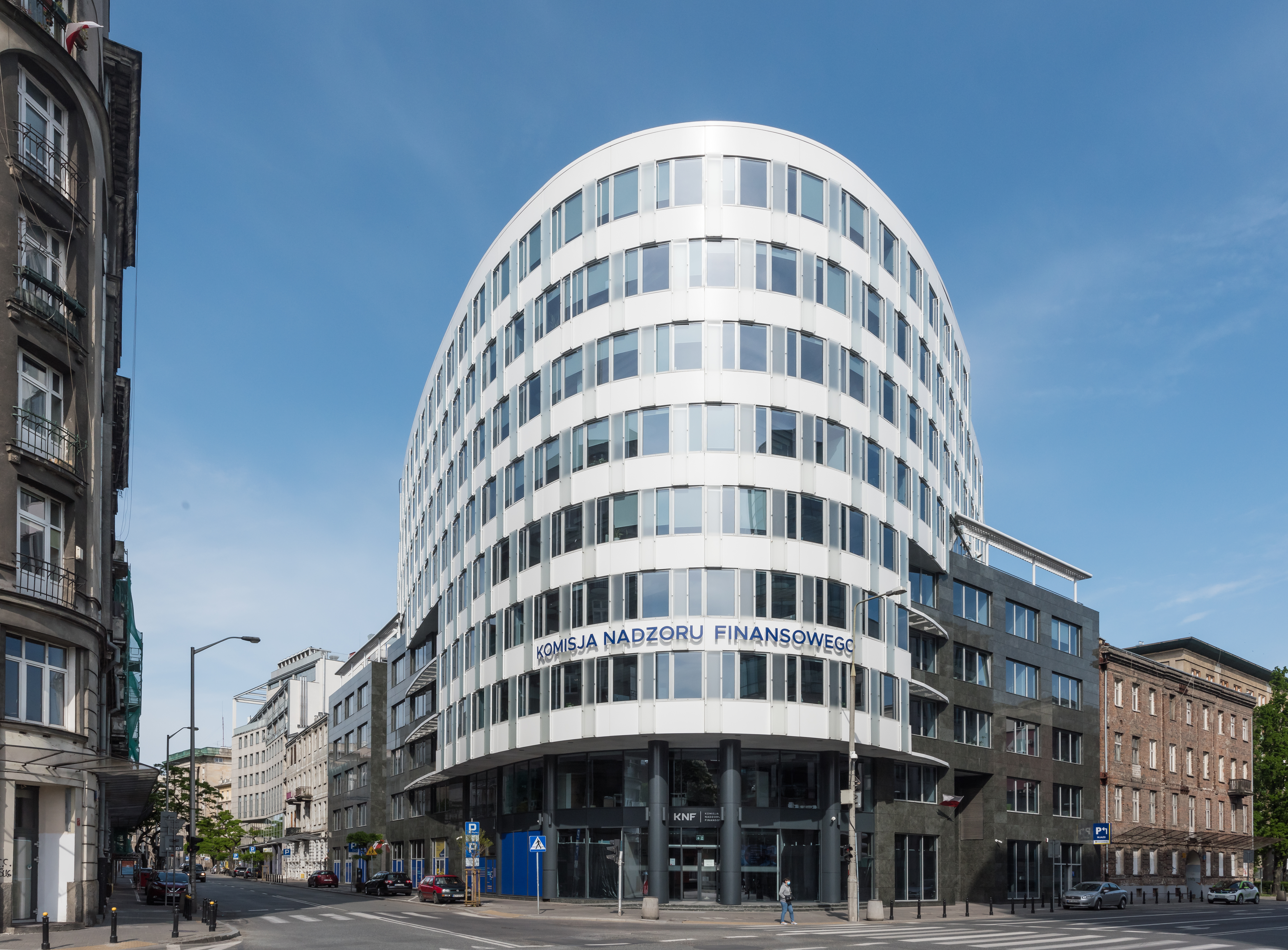
Head office of the Financial Supervision Authority in Warsaw

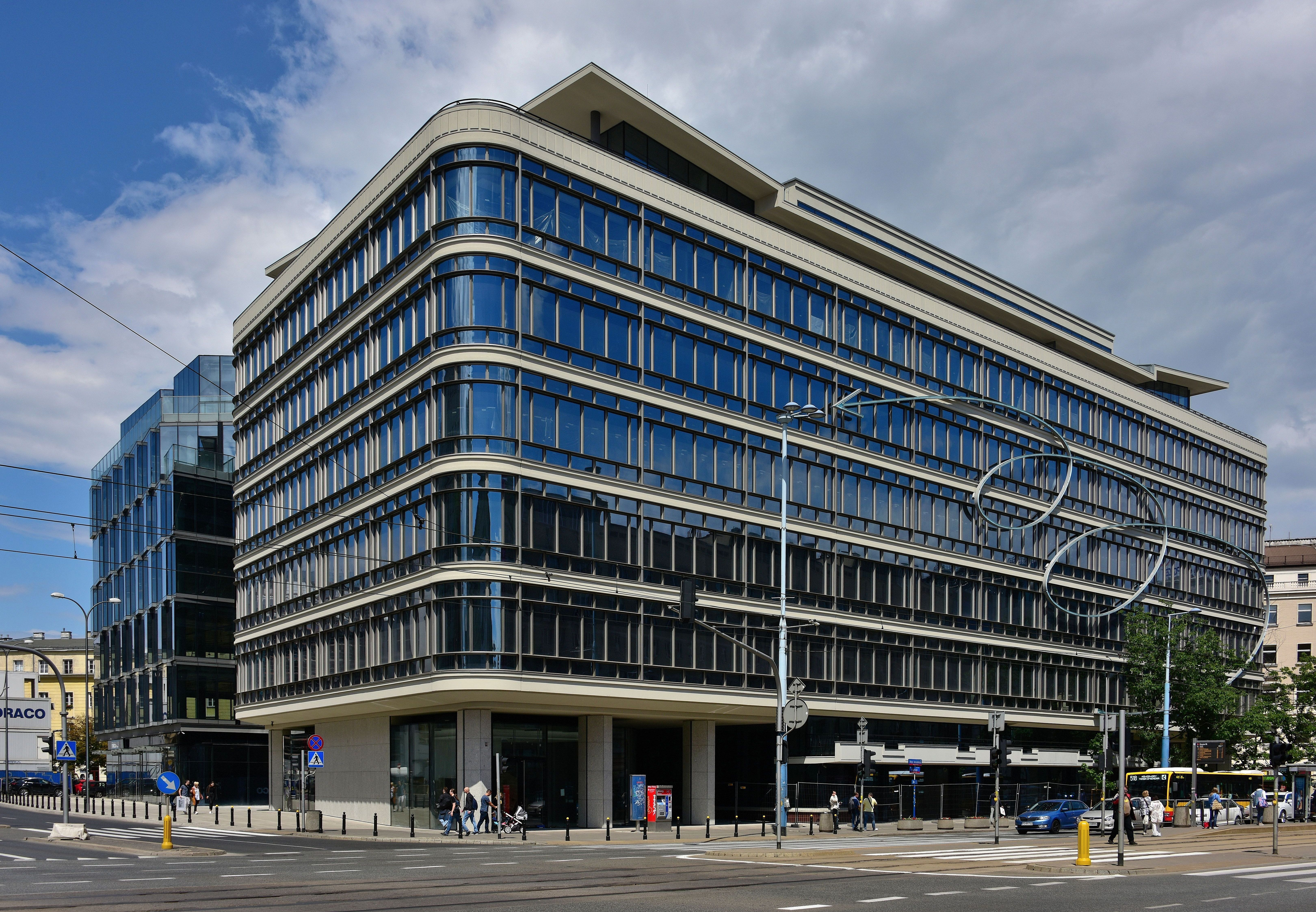
Polish Development Fund, established in April 2016

The Polish banking sector is regulated by the Polish Financial Supervision Authority (PFSA).

While transforming the country to a market-oriented economy during 1992–97, the government privatized some banks, recapitalized the rest, and introduced legal reforms that made the sector competitive. These reforms, and the health and relative stability of the sector, attracted a number of strategic foreign investors. At the beginning of 2009, Poland's banking sector had 51 domestic banks, a network of 578 cooperative banks and 18 branches of foreign-owned banks. In addition, foreign investors had controlling stakes in nearly 40 commercial banks, which made up 68% of the banking capital. Banks in Poland reacted to the 2008 financial crisis by restraining lending, raising interest rates, and strengthening balance sheets. Subsequently, the sector started lending again, with an increase of more than 4% expected in 2011.

===== Venture capital =====
The segment of the private equity market that finances early-stage high-risk companies, with the potential for fast growth, had 130 active firms in Poland (as of March 2019). Between 2009 and 2019, these entities have invested locally in over 750 companies, an average of 9 companies per portfolio. Since 2016, new legal institutions have been established for entities investing in enterprises in the seed or startup phase. In 2018, venture capital funds invested €178 million in Polish startups (0.033% of GDP). As of March 2019, total assets managed by VC companies operating in Poland are estimated at €2.6 billion. The total value of investments of the Polish VC market is €209.2 million.

==== Education ====
Education in Poland is compulsory; every child must receive education from when they are 7 years old until they are 18 years old. It is also mandatory for 6-year-old children to receive one year of kindergarten (Polish: przedszkole, literally pre-school) education, (Note: Also called "zerówka" in Polish (0th year).) before starting primary school (Polish: szkoła podstawowa) at 7 years old. Six-year-old children may also begin the first year at the request of their parents if they attended kindergarten in the preceding school year or have a positive opinion from a psychological and pedagogical counseling center. Primary school lasts eight years (years 1–8), and students must take a final exam at the end of the eighth year. After graduating from primary school, people typically go on to attend secondary school (Polish: szkoła średnia), which lasts 4 or 5 years. They can also choose to educate themselves towards a specific profession or trade, and receive work experience and qualifications through apprenticeships. After graduating from secondary school and passing the final exam, called the matura, one can pursue a higher education at a university, college, etc.

The Commission of National Education established by King Stanisław August Poniatowski in 1773 in Polish–Lithuanian Commonwealth was the first ministry of education in the world, and the traditions continue. The international PISA 2012 praised the progresses made by Polish education in mathematics, science and literacy; the number of top-performers having increased since 2003 while the number of low-performers decreased again. In 2014, the Pearson/Economist Intelligence Unit rated Polish education as fifth best in Europe and tenth best in the world.

There are several alternatives for the upper secondary education later on, the most common being the four (three until 2017) years of a liceum or five (four until 2017) years in a technikum. Both end with a maturity exam (matura, similar to French baccalauréat), and may be followed by several forms of upper education, leading to Bachelor: licencjat or inżynier (the Polish Bologna Process first cycle qualification), Master: magister (the Polish Bologna Process second cycle qualification) and eventually PhD: doktor (the Polish Bologna Process third cycle qualification). The system of education in Poland allows for 22 years of continuous, uninterrupted schooling.

==== Healthcare ====
National Health Fund logo

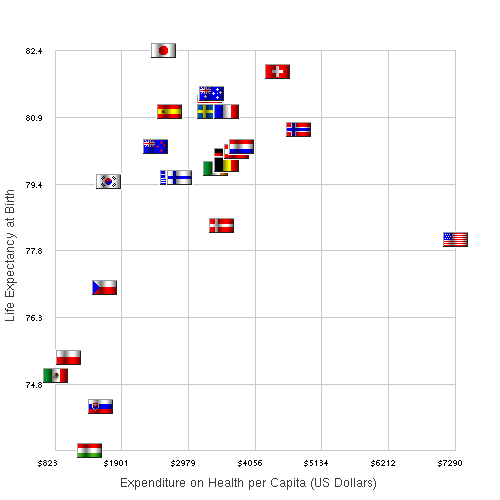
Healthcare spending vs life expectancy for some countries in 2007

Health care in Poland is insurance-based and provided through a publicly funded system known as the National Health Fund. It is free for all Polish citizens who fall under the "insured" category, which typically includes individuals with employer-paid health insurance or those who are the spouse or child of an insured person.

According to Article 68 of the Polish Constitution everyone has a right to have access to health care. Citizens are granted equal access to the publicly-funded healthcare system. In particular, the government is obliged to provide free health care to young children, pregnant women, disabled people, and the elderly. However, private health care use is very extensive in Poland. Patients who are uninsured have to pay the full cost of medical services.

According to a 2016 study by CBOS, among the 84% of patients who participated in the survey, 40% reported using both private and public health services, 37% relied solely on public health care, and 7% used only private services. Additionally, 77% of all respondents indicated that long wait times for public health care were the main reason for turning to private care.

==== Real estate and housing ====
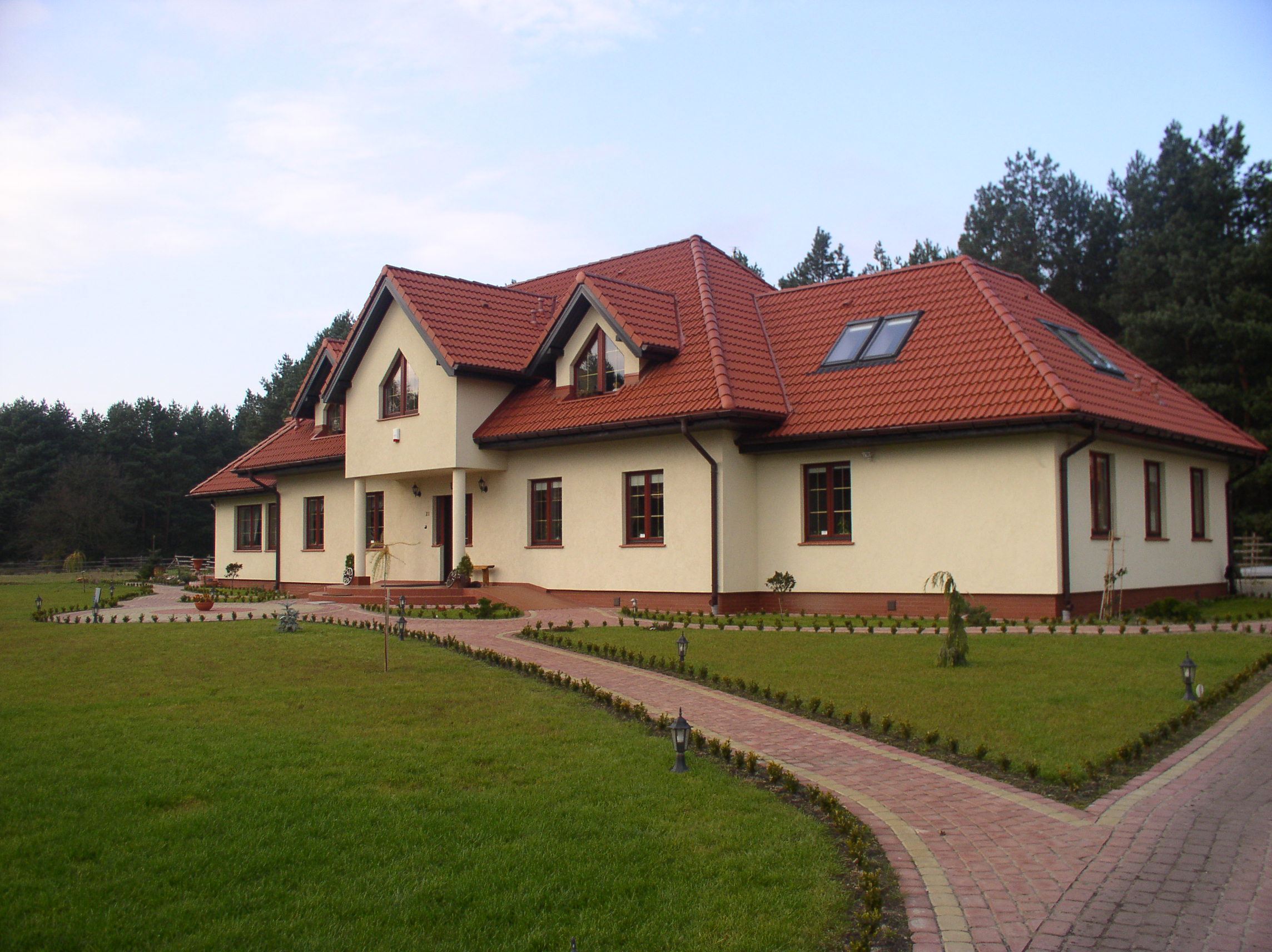
A residential country home in Poland. Approximately 51.2% of Poles resided in detached dwellings in 2025

Residential buildings in Poland are fundamentally divided into two main categories: single-family buildings (houses), and multi-family buildings (blocks of flats, apartment buildings). The former are meant to house only a small number of people, either one or a few families, while the latter are built with larger amounts of people living in their own separate areas of the same building in mind. There are also a few sub-categories, like multi-family houses (Polish: domy wielorodzinne), which can house multiple families, but don't have separate flats inside, and don't usually have separate entrances to the building. According to data from Eurostat to a 2025: 51.2% of Poles live in single-family detached houses, 33.6% live in flat in a building with ten or more dwellings, 9.1% live in Flat in a building with less than ten dwellings, 6% live in semi-detached houses, and 0.2% live in other types of buildings.

==== Tourism ====
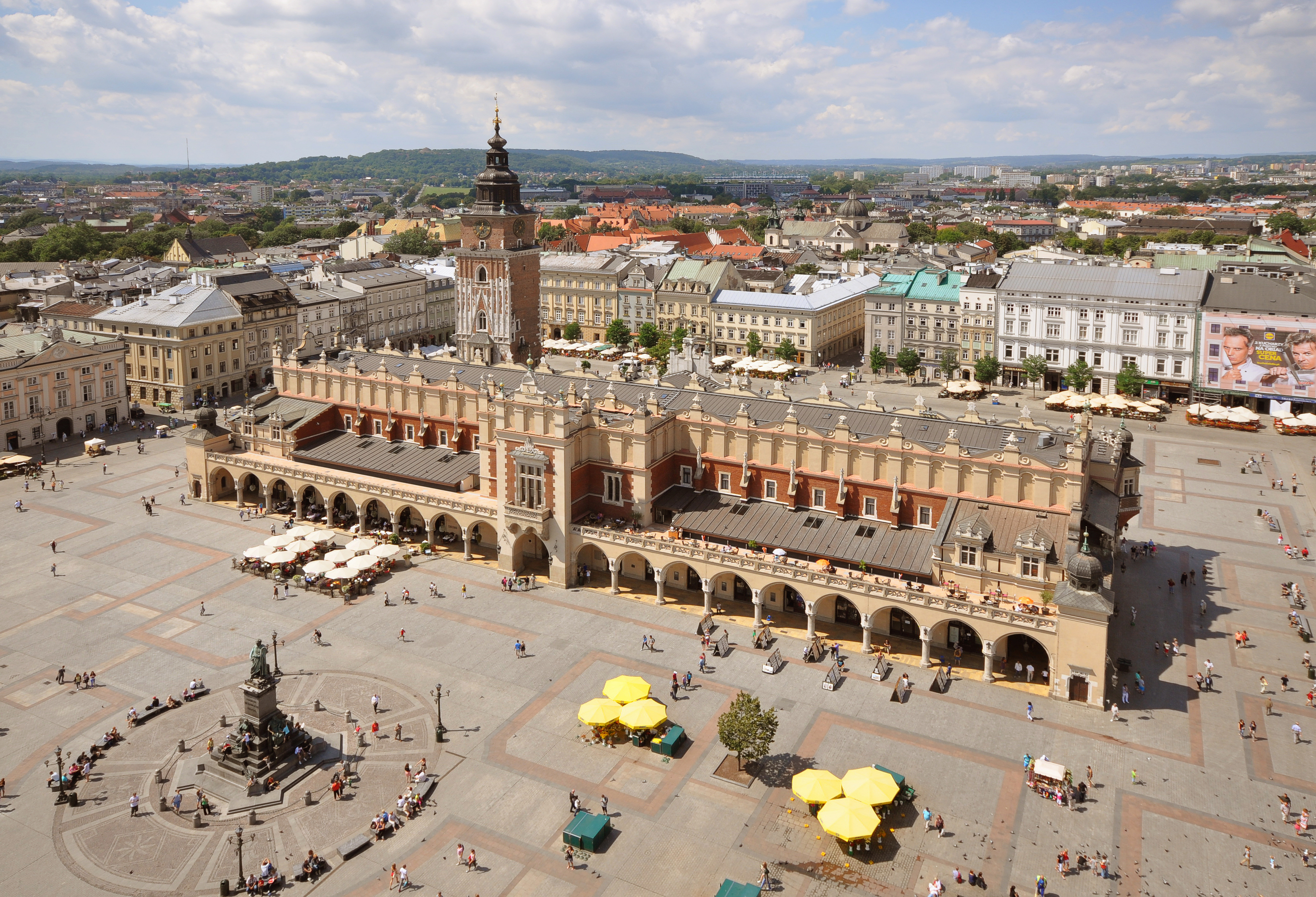
Main Square in Kraków

After acceding to the EU in 2004, tourism grew in Poland. Most tourist attractions in Poland are connected with natural environment, historic sites, and cultural events. They draw millions of tourists every year from all around the world. According to Tourist Institute's data, Poland was visited by 15.7 million tourists in 2006, and by 15 million tourists in 2007, out of the total number of 66.2 million foreign visitors. In 2016 the number of arrivals to Poland amounted to 80.5 million. 17.5 million of this number are arrivals considered for tourism purposes (with at least one night's stay), making it the 16th most visited country in the world. The most popular cities are Kraków, Warsaw, Gdańsk, Wrocław, Łódź, Poznań, Szczecin, Lublin, Toruń, Sopot, Zakopane, and the Wieliczka Salt Mine. The best recreational destinations include Poland's Masurian Lake District, Baltic Sea coast, Tatra Mountains (the highest mountain range of the Carpathians), Sudetes, and Białowieża Forest. Poland's main tourist offers consist of sightseeing within cities and out-of-town historical monuments, business trips, qualified tourism, agrotourism, mountain hiking (trekking), and climbing among others.

==== Transportation ====
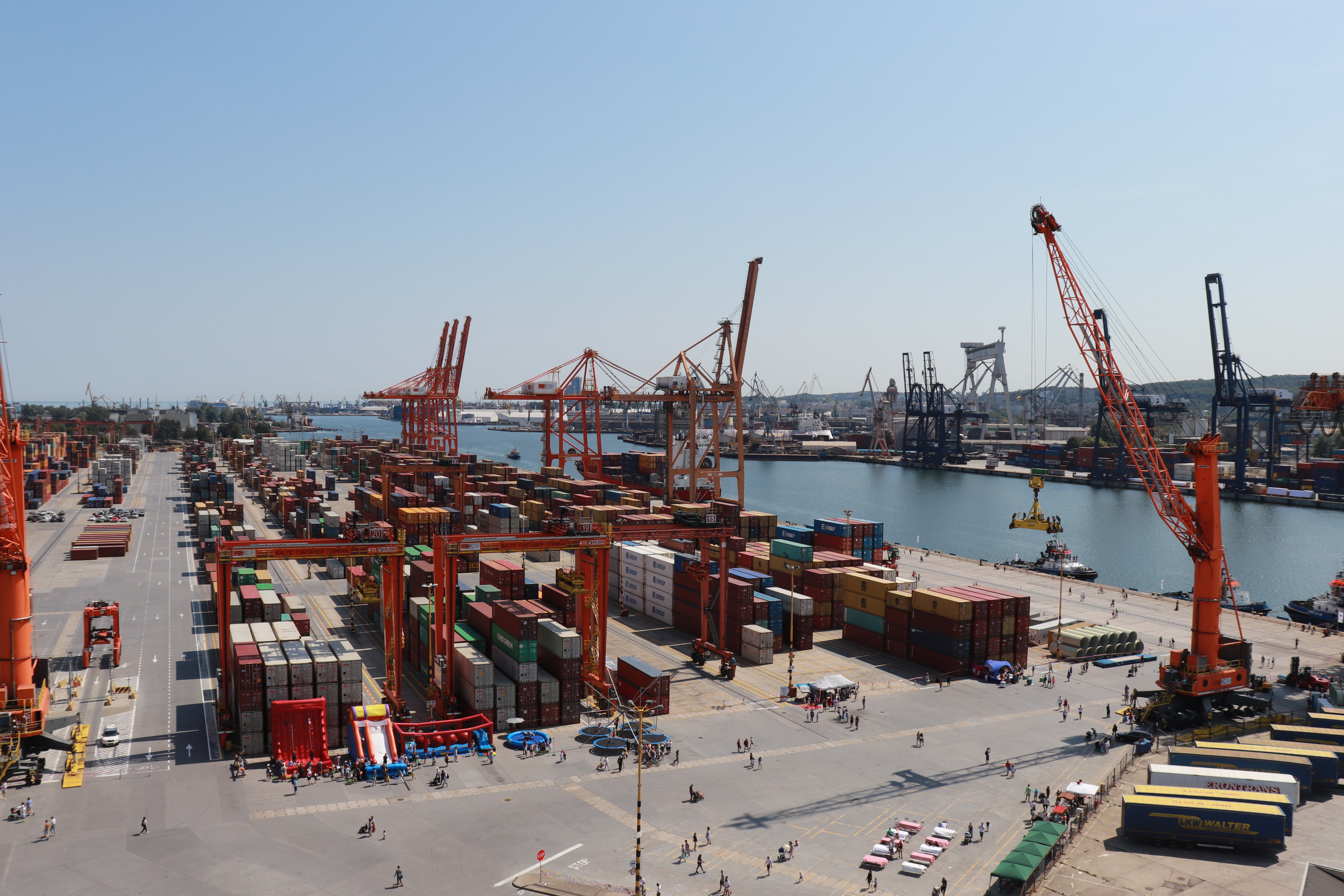
The Port of Gdynia is one of Poland's principal seaports.

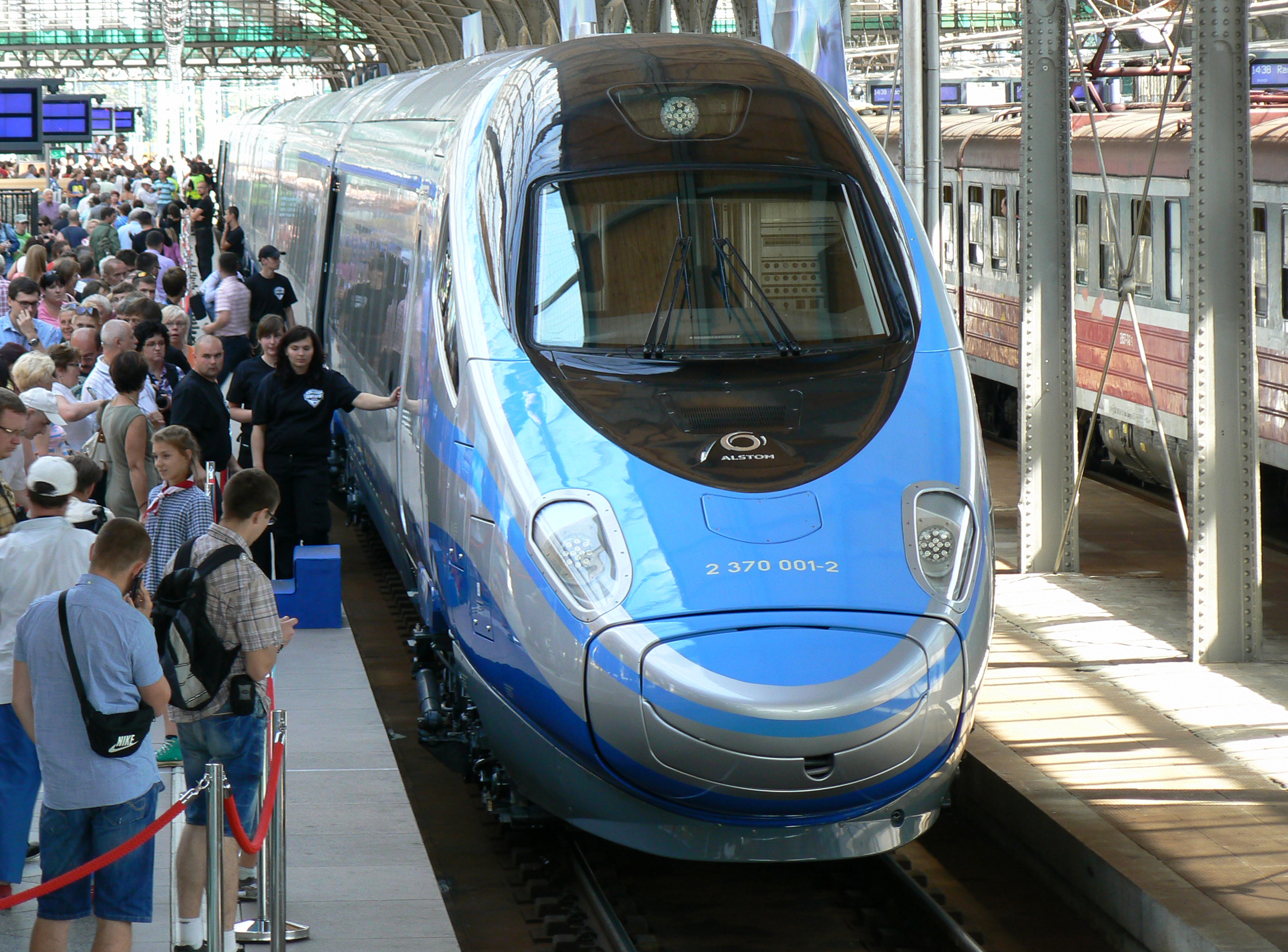
PKP Intercity ED250 Pendolino at Wrocław Main Station

Poland is served by an extensive network of railways. In most cities, the main railway station is located near a city centre and is well connected to the local transportation system. The infrastructure is operated by Polish State Railways, part of state-run PKP Group. The rail network is very dense in western and northern Poland, while the eastern part of the country is less developed. The capital city, Warsaw, has the country's only rapid transit system: the Warsaw Metro.

Poland's busiest airport is Warsaw Chopin Airport. Warsaw Chopin serves as the main international hub for Poland's flag carrier LOT Polish Airlines. In addition to Warsaw Chopin, Wrocław, Gdańsk, Katowice, Kraków, and Poznań all have international airports. In preparation for the Euro 2012 football championships jointly hosted by Poland and Ukraine, a number of airports around the country were renovated and redeveloped. This included the building of new terminals with an increased number of jetways and stands at both Wrocław Airport in Wrocław and Lech Wałęsa Airport in Gdańsk.

Poland has 412,264 km (256,170 mi) of public roads. Polish public roads are categorised by administrative division, which include national roads, voivodeship roads, Powiat roads, and Gmina roads. Motorways and expressways are part of the national road network. As of November 2026, there are 5,606.2 km of motorways and expressways in use.

=== Water supply and sanitation ===
Poland has high access to clean drinking water (89%) and sanitation (98%), though it faces structural challenges including low per-capita water resources, lower sewage connectivity in rural regions and recent cyber security vulnerabilities affecting municipal water infrastructure.

== Foreign trade and FDI ==
Exports of Poland by product category (2019) Chemical products Transportation Machines Mineral products Plastics and rubbers Metals Foodstuffs Precious metals Textiles Instruments Animal products Vegetable products Paper goods Footwear and headwear Miscellaneous Stone and glass Wood products Animal and vegetable bi-products Animal hides Arts and antiques Weapons

With the collapse of the ruble-based COMECON trade bloc in 1991, Poland reoriented its trade. As early as 1996, 70% of its trade was with EU members. Neighbouring Germany is Poland's main trading partner today. Poland joined the European Union in May 2004. Before that, it fostered regional integration and trade through the Central European Free Trade Agreement (CEFTA), which included Hungary, the Czech Republic, Slovakia, and Slovenia.

Poland is a founding member of the World Trade Organization. As a member of the European Union, it applies the common external tariff to goods from other countries including the United States. Poland's major imports are capital goods needed for industrial retooling and for manufacturing inputs. The country's exports also include machinery but are highly diversified. The most successful exports are furniture, foods, motor boats, light planes, hardwood products, casual clothing, shoes, and cosmetics. Germany is by far the biggest importer of Poland's exports as of 2013. In the agricultural sector, the biggest money-makers abroad include smoked and fresh fish, fine chocolate, dairy products, meats, and specialty breads, with the exchange rate conducive to export growth. Food exports amounted to 62 billion złoty in 2011, increasing by 17% from 2010. Most Polish exports to the U.S. receive tariff benefits under the Generalised System of Preferences (GSP) program. Poland ranks in the top 20 in the world both in terms of exports and imports, recording a clear trade surplus.

Top 20 trading partners for Poland in 2021 (millions of EUR)
| Rank | Country | Total Trade | Exports | Imports |
|---|---|---|---|---|
| 1 | (European Union) Germany | ▲143,450 | ▲82,860 | ▲60,590 |
| 2 | China | ▲45,912 | ▲3,062 | ▲42,850 |
| 3 | (European Union) Italy | ▲27,977 | ▲13,362 | ▲14,615 |
| 4 | (European Union) France | ▲26,214 | ▲16,532 | ▲9,682 |
| 5 | (European Union) Czechia | ▲26,181 | ▲17,042 | ▲9,139 |
| 6 | Russia | ▲24,999 | ▲7,998 | ▲17,001 |
| 7 | (European Union) Netherlands | ▲24,502 | ▲12,518 | ▲11,984 |
| 8 | United Kingdom | ▲18,954 | ▲14,402 | ▼4,552 |
| 9 | United States | ▲16,543 | ▲7,626 | ▲8,917 |
| 10 | (European Union) Belgium | ▲14,273 | ▲7,133 | ▲7,140 |
| 11 | (European Union) Spain | ▲13,575 | ▲7,285 | ▲6,290 |
| 12 | (European Union) Slovakia | ▲12,849 | ▲7,398 | ▲5,451 |
| 13 | (European Union) Sweden | ▲12,841 | ▲8,036 | ▲4,805 |
| 14 | (European Union) Hungary | ▲11,591 | ▲7,189 | ▲4,402 |
| 15 | (European Union) Austria | ▲11,053 | ▲6,499 | ▲4,554 |
| 16 | Ukraine | ▲10,517 | ▲6,270 | ▲4,247 |
| 17 | (European Union) Romania | ▲8,771 | ▲5,992 | ▲2,779 |
| 18 | Turkey | ▲7,906 | ▲2,648 | ▲5,258 |
| 19 | (European Union) Denmark | ▲7,615 | ▲4,706 | ▲2,909 |
| 20 | South Korea | ▲7,310 | ▲774 | ▲6,536 |

Poland is less dependent on external trade than most other Central and Eastern European countries, but its volume of trade with Europe is still substantial. In 2011 the volume of trade (exports plus imports) with the Eurozone as share of GDP was 40%, a doubling from the mid-1990s. 30% of Poland's exports are to Germany and another 30% to the rest of Europe. There has been substantial increase in Poland's exports to Russia. However, in August 2014, exports of fruits and vegetables to Russia fell dramatically following its politically motivated ban by Moscow.

Foreign direct investment (FDI) was at 40% of GDP in 2010, a doubling over the level in 2000. Most FDI into Poland comes from France, Germany, and the Netherlands. Polish firms in turn have foreign investments primarily in Italy and Luxembourg. Most of the internal FDI is in manufacturing, which makes it susceptible to economic fluctuations in the source countries.

The UAE is Poland's largest trading partner in the Arab world.

The government offers investors various forms of state aid, such as CIT tax at the level of 19% and investment incentives in 14 Special Economic Zones (among others: income tax exemption, real estate tax exemption, competitive land prices), several industrial and technology parks, the possibility to benefit from the EU structural funds, brownfield, and greenfield locations. According to the National Bank of Poland (NBP), the level of FDI inflow into Poland in 2006 amounted to €13.9 billion.

According to an Ernst & Young report, Poland ranks 7th in the world in terms of investment attractiveness. However, Ernst & Young's 2010 European attractiveness survey reported that Poland saw a 52% decrease in FDI job creation and a 42% decrease in number of FDI projects since 2008. According to an OECD report, in 2004 Poland was one of the hardest-working nations in Europe. In 2010, the World Economic Forum ranked Poland near the bottom of OECD countries in terms of the clarity, efficiency, and neutrality of the legal framework used by firms to settle disputes.

== Labour market, welfare and wages ==
GDP (PPP) of Poland

Unemployment rate in Poland in 1997–2014

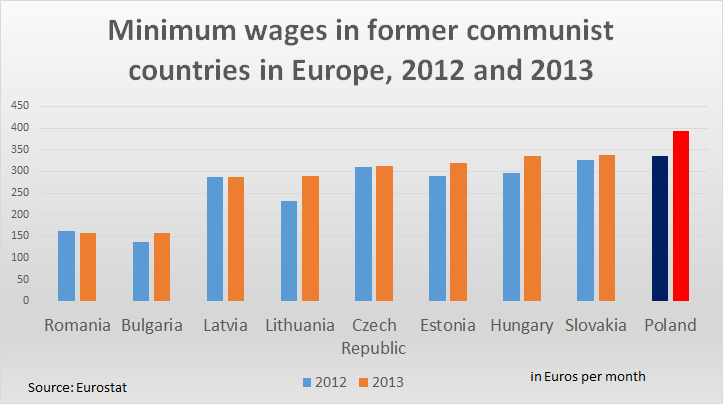
Minimum wages in Euros per month (data for former Eastern Bloc countries in Europe)

Unemployment in Poland became a major problem after the Revolutions of 1989, which collapsed communism in Poland, (Note: The first year after communism fell had relatively moderate unemployment, staying beneath 10%. Afterwards, unemployment rates began rising and in the years following, unemployment reached high levels, peaking at 20% in 2003. Also, according to the Polish Monthly Labor Review, "During the early stages of the transition [away from communism], registered unemployment increased, peaking at 16.4 percent in 1993 and then decreasing to 10.5 percent in 1998, when the economy improved.") although the economy previously had high levels of hidden unemployment. The unemployment rate then fell to 10% by the late 1990s and then increased again in the first few years of the 21st century, reaching a peak of 20% in 2002. It has since decreased, although unevenly. Since 2008 the unemployment rate in Poland has consistently been below European average.

The rate fell below 8% in 2015 and 3.2% in 2019 leading to a labour deficit. As of July 2026, according to Eurostat, the unemployment rate in Poland is 3.1%, up from 2.6% in February 2023.

=== Welfare ===
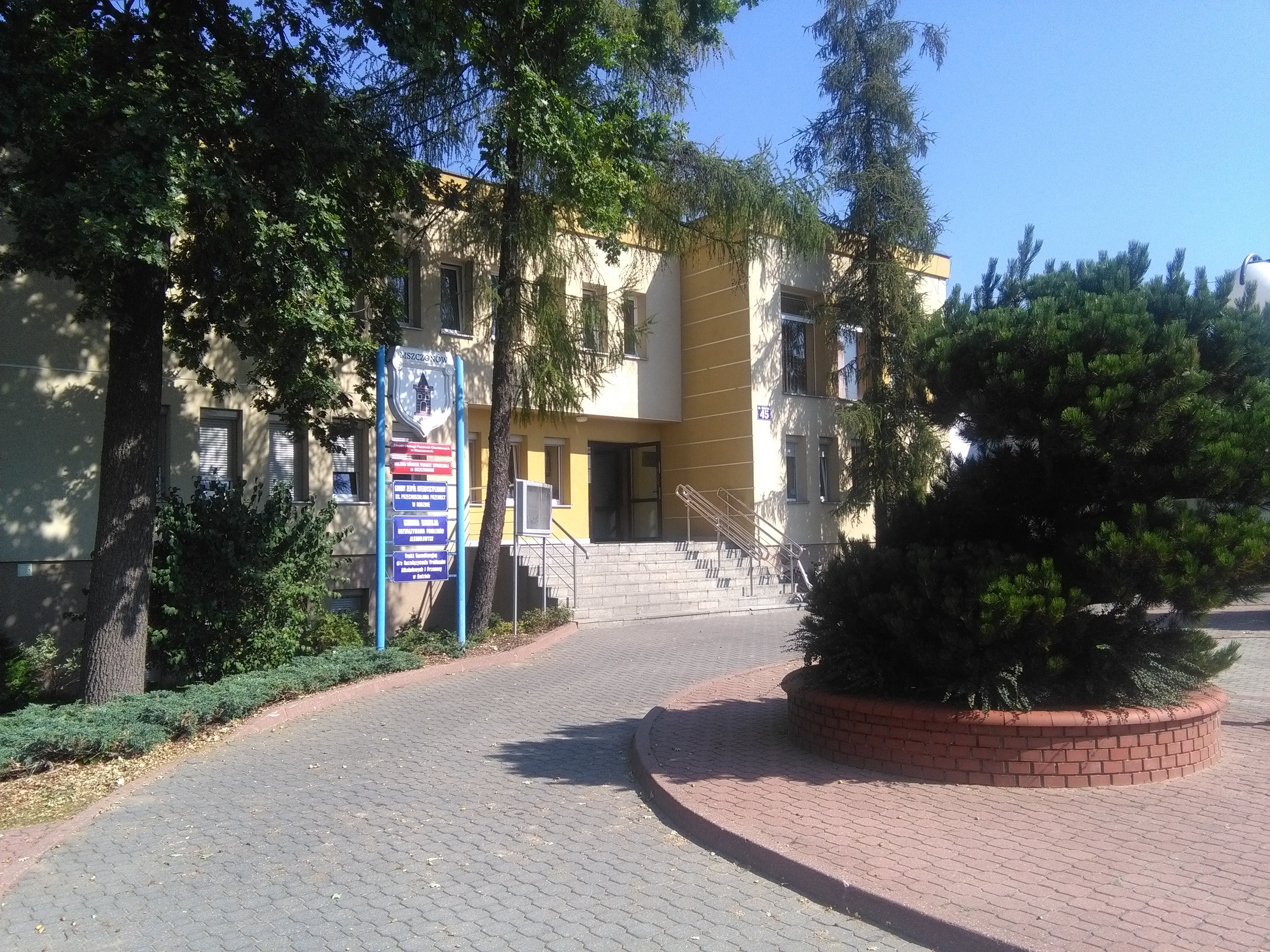
Polish Social Welfare Centre (MOPS)

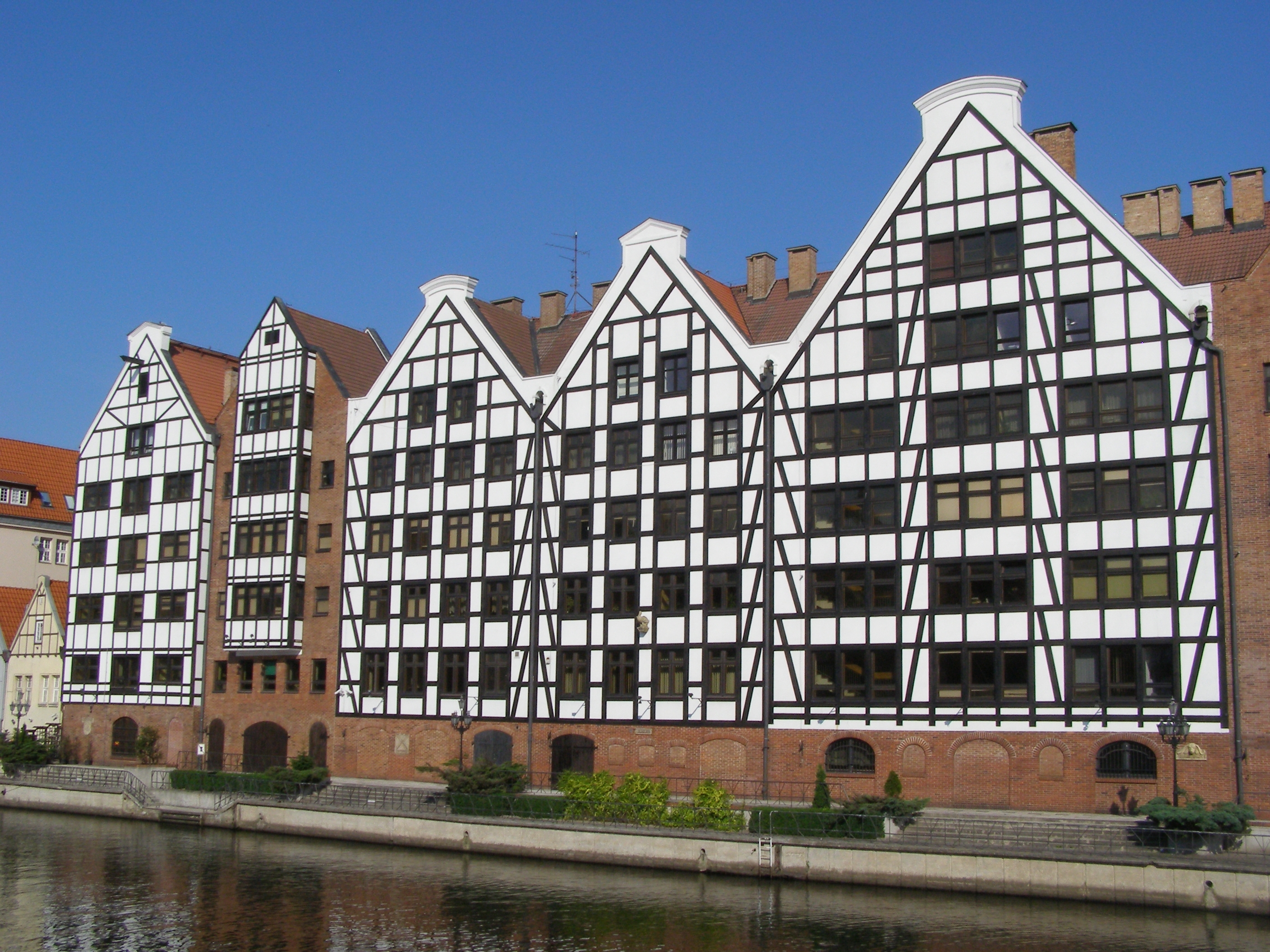
Headquarters of ZUS (Zakład Ubezpieczeń Społecznych), which specializes in social insurance matters

Welfare in Poland is part of the social security system in Poland. It constitutes about 20% of government spending, and has been roughly stable in the past several decades. The Constitution of Poland states that all citizens have the right to social security in case of being unable to find a job, reaching the retirement age, or suffering from inability to work due to illness or disability. In detail, the law on welfare in Poland is covered by a 2003 law, updated several times, including in 2012.

== Poverty ==
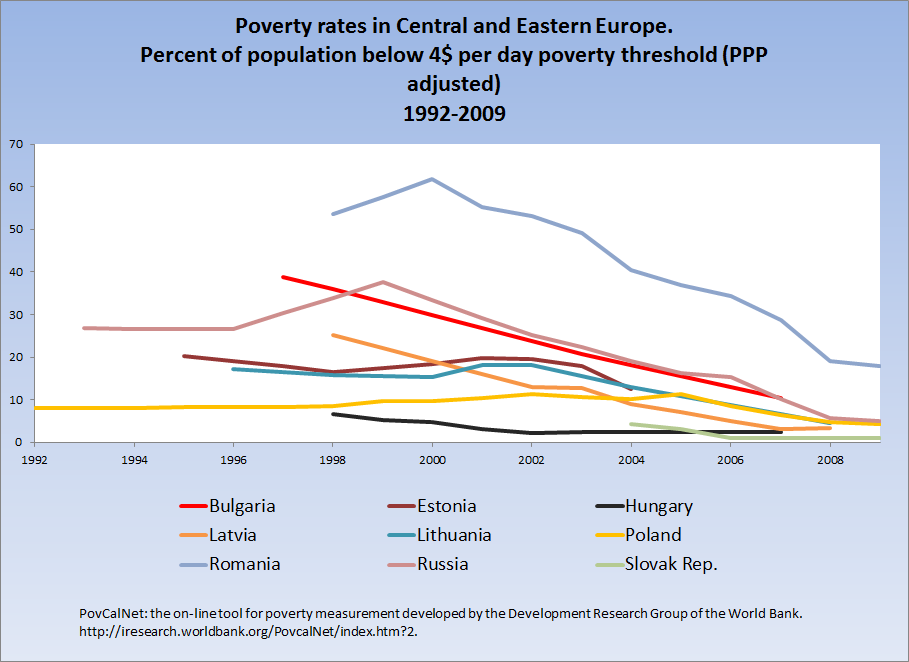
Poverty Headcount (% of population) living at below $4 (purchasing power adjusted) per day in Central and Eastern Europe, 1992-2009 (missing years were linearly interpolated). Poland is represented by the yellow line.

Poverty in Poland has been relatively stable in the past decades, affecting (depending on measure) about 6.5% of the society. In the last decade there has been a lowering trend, as in general Polish society is becoming wealthier and the economy is enjoying one of the highest growth rates in Europe. There have been noticeable increases in poverty around the turns of the decades, offset by decreases in poverty in the years following those periods.

== Major companies in Poland ==
Selection of major Polish companies including from the list of 500 largest companies in Poland compiled by magazine Polityka:

- PKO Bank Polski – banking
- InPost – package delivery logistics
- Orlen – petrochemicals
- Bank Pekao – banking
- PZU – insurance
- Grupa Azoty – chemical manufacturing
- Dino – grocery supermarkets
- Galeon Yachts – yacht manufacturer
- Sunreef Yachts – yacht manufacturer
- PSS Szczesniak – Industrial Truck/Special Vehicles manufacturer
- Autosan – bus manufacturer
- Solaris Bus & Coach – bus and tram manufacturing
- Stadler Polska - Tram manufacturer
- Modertrans Poznan - Tram/rail transport manufacturer
- Newag – train and tram manufacturing
- PESA – train and tram manufacturing
- ESky Group – tourism industry
- Protram Wroclaw - Tram manufacturing/maintenance
- QLOC – software developer/video game port developer
- Allegro – retail and online auctions
- Synerise – software developer
- Techland – video games
- E. Wedel – chocolate goods
- Fakro (pl) – roof windows and attic stairs manufacturer
- People Can Fly – video games
- 4F – sports equipment
- LPP – clothing
- Vistula Group (pl) – clothing
- CD Projekt – video game distribution and development
- Platige Image – computer graphics and special effects
- Pronar – agricultural machinery
- Netguru – IT
- Orange Polska – telecommunications
- Netia – telecommunications
- Black Red White – furniture
- Fasing – metal industry
- PSE-Operator – national power grid operator
- PGNiG – oil and gas
- Polsat – media
- Agora SA – media
- Nowy Styl Group – office furniture manufacturer
- Maspex – food manufacturing
- ROMET – bicycles
- Delphia Yachts – yacht manufacturer
- Inglot Cosmetics – beauty, cosmetics
- Dr. Irena Eris – beauty, cosmetics
- WB Group – defence industry
- Hertz System Technologies - Military anti-drone solutions
- Advanced Protection Systems - Military/defense equipment manufacturer
- Apart – jewelry
- Beesfund – crowdfunding company
- Grycan – ice cream company
- Orbis – hotels
- Asseco – IT
- KGHM Polska Miedź – copper mining
- Kompania Węglowa – coal mining
- Echo Investment – real estate development
- Pekaes – logistics
- Polferries – transport
- Grupa Lotos – petrochemicals
- FB "Łucznik" Radom – defence industry
- Polish State Railways (PKP) – national railway
- Poczta Polska – national post
- Cersanit – ceramic goods (sanitary and tiles)
- TVN – media
- Globe Trade Centre – real estate development
- Elektrim – diversified utilities, mobile phone service
- Ericpol – IT
- Volkswagen Poznań – automotive
- Fiat – Polish branch of Fiat Group (former FSM)
- General Motors Poland – automotive
- Warsaw Stock Exchange
- Polska Grupa Zbrojeniowa – defence industry
- Comarch – IT
- LiveChat Software – IT
- RTB House – online advertising
- Tauron Group – electricity distribution
- Boryszew – automotive industry
- ZMT SA – defence industry
- Amica – engineering industry
- Quemetica – chemical industry
- Polar – home appliances
- PMR Ltd – B2B market research, business consultancy
- Metro Group Poland – retail
- Wielton – utility vehicles manufacturer
- Zortrax – 3D printing
- CI Games – video games
- Metal Master – private jet aircraft
- Kross SA – bicycles
- XTB S.A. – fintech company

== Potential of the Polish economy in the EU ==
Poland, measured by the purchasing power parity index, is the sixth-largest economy in the European Union and the eighth-largest economy in Europe, slightly ahead of the Netherlands.

Poland recorded GDP growth even during the 2008 financial crisis. The unemployment rate in the country remains very low and amounted to 5% in September 2023. As of July 2026, according to Eurostat, the unemployment rate in Poland is 3.1%, up from 2.6% in February 2023.

Although the Polish economy is catching up with Western European countries, this has been a slow process. So far, taking into account the level of social development, Poland has managed to overtake Portugal. There is a great deal of variation between regions. Masovian Voivodeship is on a similar level to the richest regions of Spain and most regions of France (82% of the EU average). However, it should be remembered that the GDP of this voivodeship is mainly generated by Warsaw. Lower Silesian Voivodeship with a GDP of $16,000 is on par with Portugal and the regions of Spain and Greece. Subsequent voivodeships reached about 50% of the EU average, and the poorest voivodships of the eastern wall have GDP per capita comparable to Romania and Bulgaria.

Polish capital has several large concerns in this region of Europe, i.e. PKN Orlen, which has its stations in Germany and Lithuania, Polsat, which also invests in Lithuania, the ITI Group. Poland has a highly developed road network, most of the A1, A2, A4 highways and expressways, including S6 and S7, are fully completed. The next ones are to be ready by 2023. Their construction by private companies is financed in part by the EU. In the coming years, Poland is to receive approximately EUR 4.5 billion for the modernisation of railways.

From 2017 through 2020 Poland issued more residence permits to non-EU immigrants (the vast majority of them Ukrainians) than any other EU member state in each of those four years.

A 2025 study by the business coalition Open for Business estimated that workplace exclusion and diminished public health outcomes cost the Polish economy up to 20.4 billion PLN annually due to talent loss and systemic discrimination.

== International rankings ==
World map representing Human Development Index categories (based on 2019 data, published in 2020): Very high (≥ 0.800) High (0.700–0.799) Medium (0.550–0.699) / Low (≤ 0.549) Data unavailable

- 35th in Human Development Index (2023)
- 35th in Inequality-adjusted Human Development Index (2023)
- 27th in Average Wage Index (2025)
- 34th in Democracy Index (2025)
- 6th in Henley Passport Index (2026)
- 4th in The Passport Index (2026)
- 27th in OECD Better Life Index (2020)
- 23rd in Human Capital Index (2020)
- 25th in Quality of Nationality Index (2018)
- 36th in Legatum Prosperity Index (2026)
- 33rd in Social Progress Index (2024)
- 15th in EF English Proficiency Index (2025)
- 40th in Ease of Doing Business (2020)
- 21st in Economic Complexity Index (2023)
- 37th in Global Competitiveness Report (2019)
- 40th in Index of Economic Freedom (2024)
- 22nd in Global Peace Index (2026)
- 53rd in Corruption Perceptions Index (2025)
- 39th in Global Innovation Index (2026)
- 23rd in Good Country Index (2023)
- 27th in Press Freedom Index (2026)

== See also ==
- List of companies of Poland
- List of largest Polish companies
- List of state-owned enterprises of Poland
- List of regions of Poland by GDP
- List of Polish voivodeships by Human Development Index
- List of Poles by net worth
- Balcerowicz Plan
- Black market in Poland
- Copyright law of Poland
- Corruption in Poland
- Eastern Poland
- Lublin Triangle
- Migrations from Poland since accession to the European Union
- Ministry of Economic Development and Technology (Poland)
- Ministry of Finance (Poland)
- Ministry of Funds and Regional Policy
- Ministry of Infrastructure (Poland)
- National Bank of Poland
- Patent Office of the Republic of Poland
- Poland A and B
- Poland and the International Monetary Fund
- Poland and the World Bank
- Science and technology in Poland
- Tax and Customs Service (Poland)
- Trade unions in Poland
- Upper Silesian Industrial Region
- Economy of the European Union
- Economy of Europe
