= Poland and the International Monetary Fund =

Flag of Poland

Poland was one of the founding members of the International Monetary Fund (IMF) in 1945. Under pressure from the Soviet Union, the country withdrew in 1950, believing that the organization had become a tool for the United States. Poland rejoined the IMF in 1986, following the end of martial law in Poland (1981–1983) and the withdrawal of the US veto against Polish membership.

Poland's subsequent involvement with IMF lending facilities can be separated into two periods: emergence from communism and Stand-By Arrangements (SBA) from 1990 to 1996, followed by Flexible Credit Line (FCL) arrangements from 2009 to 2017. The first years mark Poland's transition from a planned to a market economy, aided by the IMF, followed by Poland's growth through the 2008 financial crisis and Euro area crisis. In 2018, Poland purchased a large number of gold reserves, the largest purchase since 1983.

== Return to the IMF ==
=== Extended Fund Facility and Stand-By Arrangements (1990–1996) ===
The Fall of Communism in Poland in 1989 launched the country's transition from a planned to a market economy. High debt severely hindered Poland's transition, with annual loan and interest payments equivalent to US$10.3 billion, one-sixth of the country's gross domestic product (GDP). Poland's first IMF agreement was approved in February 1990 for a one-year term of special drawing rights (SDR) 545 million. Although the country relied heavily upon the IMF's financing, particular importance was given to the loan's conditionality, a criterion for economic reforms.

However, upon implementation, the reforms faced resistance from the government, primarily concerning monetary policy and the rate of privatization. The transition period resulted in a recession as real term wages fell after currency revaluation of the Polish złoty. Political opposition led to a deviation from the IMF's reform program, with the government easing monetary policy in the second half of 1990. Poland's first agreement came to an end in March 1991 with the member nation having drawn upon SDR 357.5 million.

The Paris Club, an informal group of Western governments, announced a proposal to forgive half of Poland's US$33 billion debt, contingent upon the nation signing a new arrangement with the IMF. The loan reduction was offered in two stages: 30% awarded upon accepting the IMF arrangement and an additional 20% forgiven upon completion of the arrangement terms.

The IMF required clear actions to be taken by Poland towards currency and price stabilization. Poland responded by devaluing the zloty and establishing a 'crawling peg' against the US dollar. Although the IMF hoped for Poland to take a more active role in limiting inflation, the organization offered the country a new arrangement from its Extended Fund Facility (EFF). This fund is employed for member nations whose economic difficulties present a medium-to-long-term balance of payment deficit, requiring a longer arrangement period to enable the provision of fundamental economic reforms. A two-year term loan of SDR 1.224 billion was approved a month after the expiration of Poland's first arrangement.

Deviations from the policy reform of 1990 began to show after the second IMF agreement had been signed in April 1991. The following two years (1991–1992) saw an increase in the budget deficit from 3% to 7% as a share of GDP and a 44% inflation rate. This resulted in the IMF suspending Poland from the EFF in June 1991, two months after approval was initially granted. Negotiations in 1991 and 1992 to lift the suspension were unsuccessful. Poland's second agreement came to an end in March 1993 with the member nation having drawn upon SDR 76.5 million.

Witnessing the failure of completion, the Paris Club adjusted requirements for loan forgiveness, announcing that the second stage (the additional 20%) of loan reduction would be awarded upon the success of an additional IMF program in 1993. Poland entered a year-long IMF Stand-By Arrangement (SBA) of loan sum SDR 476 million. The IMF limited its disapproval of Poland's budget deficit and inflation rate, which streamlined negotiations. Supported by the IMF, the Polish government proposed conservative fiscal policies, including expenditure cuts and new taxes equivalent to 5% of GDP. The program was successful, ending in April 1994 with Poland having drawn upon SDR 357 million.

The London Club, an informal group of international private lenders, agreed to reduce Poland's US$13 billion debt by 45% contingent upon an IMF arrangement. Poland entered the fourth agreement, a two-year SBA loan of SDR 333.3 million in August 1994, four months following the end of its previous SBA. The reforms were identical to those of previous agreements: reduction in the inflation rate, reduction in budget deficits and sustained economic growth. Poland's fourth agreement came to an end in March 1996, the member nation having drawn upon SDR 283 million. It was Poland's last SBA with the IMF as of 2018, due to the country's GDP reaching pre-transition levels in real terms in 1996.

=== Flexible Credit Line (2009—2017) ===
Poland's next arrangement with IMF occurred 15 years after the previous SBA in 1994, in the form of a Flexible Credit Line (FCL) in 2009. The FCL is an IMF arrangement, a precautionary credit line created in 2009 following the 2008 financial crisis. Its aim was to provide the organization's members with an alternative lending stream to a short-term balance of payment deficits caused by external shocks. FCL is similar in structure to a SBA, as it must be requested by the member nation and approval is dependent on predetermined qualification criteria. These arrangements do not exceed two years in length. The two principal distinctions in comparison to SBAs are the absence of access limits or conditionalities, as FCL-qualifying nations are perceived to consistently implement responsible and appropriate macroeconomic policy.

Poland first entered into an FCL at the onset of the credit line's inception in 2009. A one-year FCL arrangement of SDR 13.69 billion (US$20.58 billion), 1,000% of Poland's quota at the time, was agreed upon with a six-month review. Polish authorities stated that the credit line was a precautionary action, rather than emergency funding. The credit line increased the country's reserves by one-third during this period and provided security against macroeconomic issues deriving from a volatile currency which had seen a 40% fall between July 2008 and April 2009. This arrangement was renewed the following year for another one-year term. In 2011, Poland's third (consecutive) FCL arrangement was extended for a two-year term and increased in sum from SDR 13.69 to SDR 19.17 billion (US$30 billion at the time). These expansions were a result of IMF reforms in August 2010, which included doubling arrangement lengths and removing access caps to monetary resources at 1,000% of a country's IMF quota. Poland's new arrangement was 1,400% of its quota. Poland's fourth (consecutive) FCL arrangement was increased to SDR 22 billion (US$33.8 billion), but fell relative to its quota (1,303% of quota). The increase was sought by the Polish government to alleviate falling economic growth which stemmed from the Eurozone's financial instability. Poland's fifth (consecutive) FCL arrangement saw an access reduction, at the request of the Polish government, to SDR 15.5 billion (US$23 billion), 918% of the country's quota. The Executive Director for Poland believed that the reduced FCL was possible due to a strengthening policy framework improving economic buffers, thereby reducing financing needs. However, the risk of external economic shocks failed to diminish, encouraging continued membership of FCL. Poland's sixth (consecutive) FCL arrangement saw a further access reduction, at the request of the Polish government, to SDR 6.5 billion (US$9.2 billion), 159% of the country's quota. The requested reduction signaled Poland's intent to gradually withdraw from continued renewal of its FCL arrangements.

Despite 14 months remaining on Poland's FCL agreement, Poland's deputy prime minister and finance minister, Mateusz Morawiecki, announced in October 2017 that the country would resign from its current arrangement (approved 2017) and the credit line overall. Morawiecki stated that the decision was determined following analysis of tax data, macroeconomic parameters, and evaluation of budget stability and currency reserves. The FCL arrangement expired the following month on 2 November 2017. The sixth approved FCL was never drawn upon by the Polish government.

=== Current assessment ===
Following several years of growth, the economy of Poland is expected to slow to a more sustainable pace. Near-term growth is expected to slow to 3 to 3 1/2 percent in the financial year 2019–20, with low unemployment. The banking system in the aggregate appears to be showing resilience to adverse shocks, although some medium-sized banks may be weak.
