= Poland and the World Bank =

World Bank Logo

After separating from the World Bank and other International Financial Institutions for decades due to pressure from the Soviet Union, Poland rejoined the World Bank on June 27, 1986. The World Bank was instrumental in financing and providing technical assistance for Poland as it transitioned from a Command Economy into a Market-Oriented Economy. As a middle income country, Poland has worked primarily with the International Bank for Reconstruction and Development since it is not eligible for loans from the International Development Association. Additionally, Poland has had a few projects with the Multilateral Investment Guarantee Agency and the International Finance Corporation. Currently, most of Poland's engagements with the World Bank Group concern environmental concerns and public finances.

== Post Communist Transition ==
Despite being a founding member of the World Bank Group (WBG), Poland, due to pressure from the Soviet Union, did not withdraw loans from the WBG until the early 90s. Once Poland began transitioning away from the Soviet network, the WBG and its sister organization, the International Monetary Fund, provided funds and technical advice to facilitate Poland’s transition into a free-market democracy.

The World Bank was an extremely important source of financing because foreign capital was skeptical of Poland’s political and economic stability and its transition to a capitalist economy necessarily entailed the scaling back of state-directed investment. During the transition, the World Bank designed programs consistent with the International Monetary Fund’s contemporary macroeconomic principles. In 1990, the WBG dispensed the Structural Adjustment Loan (SAL). SAL was intended to support Poland’s Economic Transformation Program (ETP) which aimed to stabilize the economy, integrate Poland into the global financial market, and create the foundation of a market-oriented economy. SAL along with a series of loans that targeted narrower focuses like infrastructure and agriculture, supported the Polish government as it instituted “shock therapy.” Drawing heavily from the Washington Consensus, the ETP lifted price controls, liberalized imports, devalued the zloty, and employed restrictive credit policies.

In the WBG’s Performance Audit result, it found that SAL succeeded in restoring Poland’s credit worthiness, establishing the foundation of a market economy, and controlling inflation. Despite reporting these successes, the WBG raised concerns regarding Poland’s falling output, high unemployment, and growing inequality. Generally, Poland is regarded as one of the most radical Neoliberal reformers among the Communist successor states. By 2000, Poland’s GDP was 127% that of its 1989 GDP which stands in contrast to other Communist successor states and their struggles.

== Recent World Bank Engagements ==
As a consequence of Poland's relatively successful transition to the market, World Bank engagement with Poland in the 2000s was limited to efforts to wean Poland off of its reliance on coal: Green Investment Scheme, Coal Mine Closure Project, Poland Puck Wind Farm Project, etc. After the 2008 financial crisis, Poland was one of the few countries that emerged without experiencing negative economic growth despite a general negative correlation between the extent of Neoliberal reforms and economic growth after the 2008 financial crisis for post-Communist states. Consequently, Poland did not receive much attention from the International Financial Institutions since other members of the Eurozone were more adversely impacted.

Despite robust growth, the WBG and IMF are concerned that Poland’s aging population will portend an economic slowdown. While the World Bank has worked on projects with the Polish government that focused on stabilizing public finances by cutting government debt, Poland's governing party, Law and Justice pledged to increase healthcare spending by 41 billion USD by 2024. By comparison, healthcare spending was 21.3 billion USD in 2016.

Additionally, the WBG and Poland have worked together to alleviate pollution in Poland. Poland has 33 of the EU’s 50 most polluted cities which the NY Times attributes to its reliance on coal for energy. In response, the World Bank has supported numerous clean energy, pollution management, and environmental projects in Poland. Despite support from the World Bank, Polish citizens continue to suffer from the adverse effects of pollution. By the World Bank's own estimates, 25,000-50,000 Poles die prematurely from respiratory issues attributable to pollution. Despite projects intended to expand alternative energy capabilities in Poland, 93% of Poland's energy is currently met by coal energy.

== Current World Bank Engagement ==
As of December 2019, Poland has two loans with the International Bank for Reconstruction and Development (IBRD). Both loans concern flood management along the Odra and Vistula rivers. Poland’s mountainous areas are particularly vulnerable to floods and floods devastated large swathes of Poland in 1997, 2006, and 2010. The project aims to improve the government’s institutional response to flood and to provide it with ample infrastructure and technology to mitigate and predict the effects of potential floods.

== Interactions with the International Bank for Reconstruction and Development (IBRD) ==
Commensurate with its status as a middle-income nation, Poland is eligible for loans from the IBRD and not from the International Development Association. As of 2019, Poland has had 53 projects with the IBRD with commitments totaling 16.2 billion USD. The IBRD has primarily worked with Poland in pollution management and environmental health, infrastructure services for private sector development, and the restructuring of state-owned enterprises.

== Interactions with the Multilateral Investment Guarantee Agency (MIGA) ==
In 2010, MIGA issued guarantees which totaled 3.7 million USD to Dutch firm Linx Telecommunications and its Polish subsidiary Warsaw DC. This guarantee covered risks such as civil disturbance, war, and expropriation. Through the establishment of a data center and expanding connectivity services, the project hoped to improving Poland’s Information and Communication technology, expand telecom networks, and boost local jobs. This has been MIGA’s only engagement with Poland.

== Interactions with the International Finance Corporation (IFC) ==
Poland has had 7 investment projects, totaling 457 million USD, and 1 advisory project which totaled 5 million USD with the IFC. IFC engagement with Poland has focused on Poland’s financial services sector
