= Fasing =

Polish multinational metal industry corporation

Coordinates: 50.280889°N 19.017528°E

FASING Plc.
- Trade name: Mining Tools and Equipment Factories Capital Group FASING Plc.
- Company type: Public company
- Traded as: WSE: FSG
- ISIN: PLFSING00010
- Industry: Metal industry
- Founded: 1913
- Headquarters: Katowice, Poland
- Area served: Worldwide
- Owner: KARBON 2 Sp z o.o. (60.12%)
- Number of employees: 500–1000 (2020)
- Website: FASING Group Website

FASING Plc. (or Mining Tools and Equipment Factories Capital Group FASING Plc.) is a Polish multinational metal industry corporation. It is one of the largest chain manufacturers in the world, and is the largest producer of industrial chains in Central and Eastern Europe. The firm's products are used, among others, in mining, energy, fishing, and the transport and transshipment sector.

The company was founded in 1913 and has its headquarters in Katowice. It is listed on the Warsaw Stock Exchange.

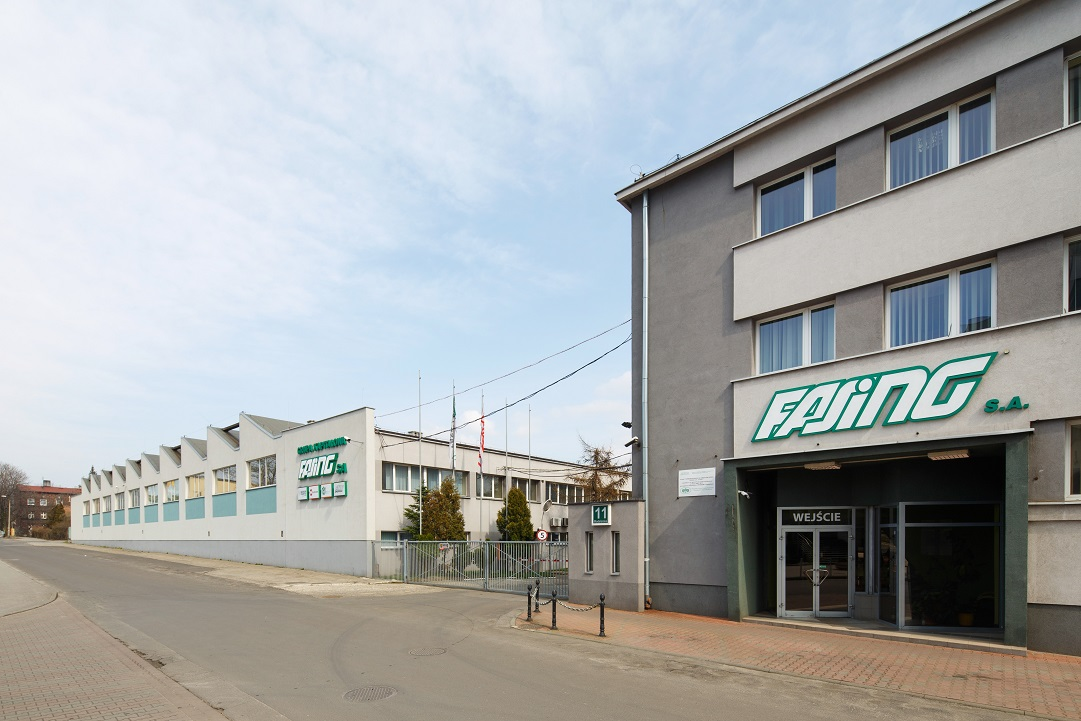
Contemporary headquarters of Fasing Group in Katowice

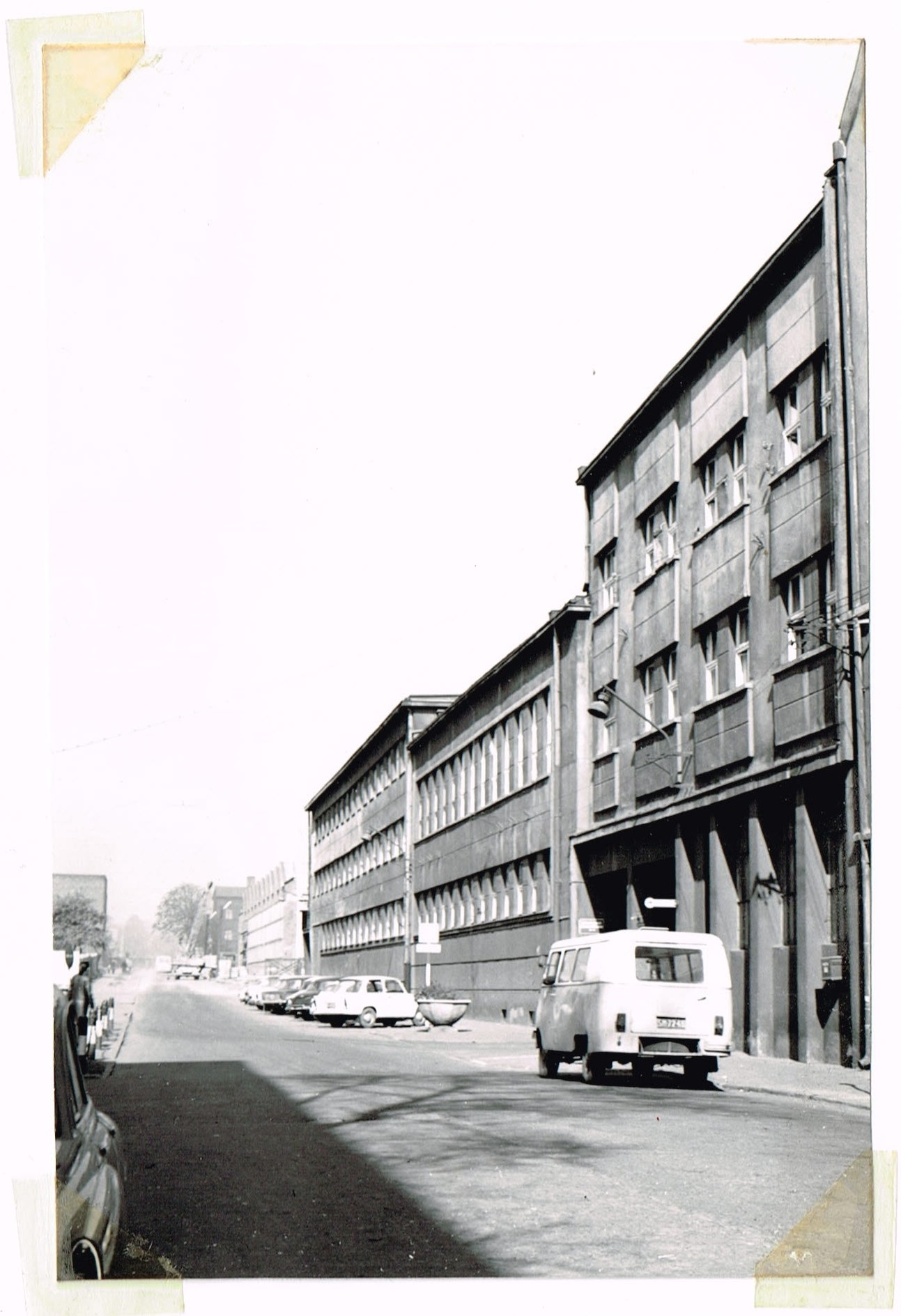
Fasing production hall in 1989

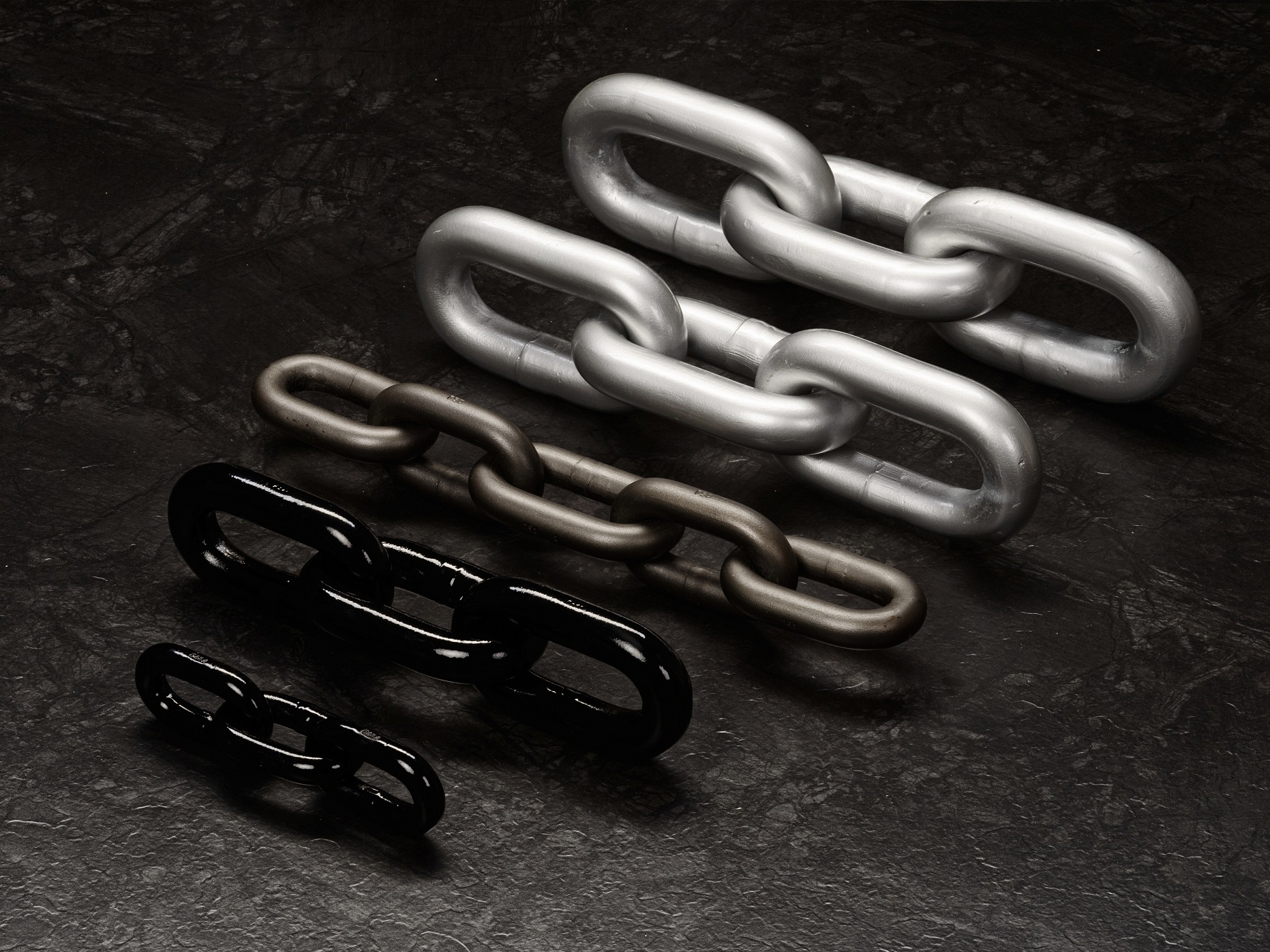
Selection of industrial chains manufactured by Fasing

== Business profile ==
The company specializes in the production of link chains for:

- Mining – round and flat mining link chains, shearer chains, suspension and transport chains, hoist chains, chain assemblies, clamps and scrapers;
- Fishing sector – trawling chains and others;
- Energy industry – chains with increased resistance to abrasion, catches and chain assemblies;
- Construction and transport – sling chains, for hoists and hooks.

In addition, the company's research laboratories carry out service activities in the field of steel chemical-composition analysis, hardness measurements, micro- and macrostructural tests and control of chosen measuring instruments.

== Portfolio diversification ==
As part of the Group, FASING manufactures complete chain assemblies and steel structures used, among others in mining and heavy industry. The Group's offer is supplemented with steel forgings and small mechanization equipment, primarily drills, couplings and pumps made by MOJ S.A. and Osowiec Foundry.

In 2017, Fasing Accounting & Consulting Services Ltd. was created, an institution specializing in tax law and accounting.

== Timeline ==
The key dates of the FASING Capital Group are:

- 1913 – Establishment of the company under the name Schlesische Gruben und Hüttenbedarfsgesellschaft m.b.H. (Śląska Górniczo-Hutnicza Spółka Akcyjna)
- 1933 – Creation of the firm Machine Factory and Foundry MOJ
- 1969 – Merger and establishment of the MOJ-RAPID Mining Equipment and Tools Factory.
- 2000 – The majority stake of the Fasing Capital Group is taken over by KARBON 2; the company enters the Warsaw Stock Exchange.
- 2006 – Foreign expansion through establishing a joint venture Shandong Liangda Fasing Round Link Chains Co. Ltd.
- 2008 – Acquisition of shares in the German company K. B. P. Kettenwerk Becker-Prunte GmbH.
- 2011 – Establishment of Fasing Ukraine Ltd.
- 2014 – Expanding to Russia through the company Mining Equipment and Tools Factory Fasing LLC.
- 2016 – Creation of a distribution company in China, Fasing Sino-Pol (Beijing) Mining Equipment and Tools Co. Ltd.
- 2017 – Further business diversification through the creation of Fasing Accounting & Consulting Services Ltd.
- 2019 – Entering the US market through Fasing America Corp.
- 2021 – Strengthening presence in Germany through the establishment of a trading company FFS Fertigung FASING Schwarz GmbH.

== Locations ==
The group is physically present in 7 countries on 3 continents:

- Poland
- United States
- China
- Germany
- Russia
- Czech Republic
- Ukraine

== Structure ==
The firm is the parent company of the capital group, which includes:

Production companies

- Mining Equipment and Tools Factory Capital Group FASING Plc. with headquarters in Katowice (parent entity in the group)
- MOJ S.A. with headquarters in Katowice (an enterprise of the electromechanical industry) together with the Forge Department "Osowiec" with headquarters in Osowiec – Opolskie Voivodeship).
- K.B.P. Kettenwerk Becker-Prünte GmbH – Germany
- Shandong Liangda Fasing Round Link Chains Co., Ltd. (山东良达发兴圆环链有限公司) – China

Distribution companies

- Fasing Sino-Pol (Beijing) Mining Equipment and Tools Co. Ltd. (华星中波（北京）矿用设备及工具有限公司) – China
- Fertigung FASING Schwarz GmbH – Germany
- Fasing America Corp. – USA
- Fasing Ukraine Ltd. (ООО Фасинг Украина) – Ukraine
- Mining Equipment and Tools Factory Fasing LLC (OOO Заклады Горного Оборудования и Инструмента Fasing) – Russia

Group portfolio diversification companies

- Fasing Accounting & Consulting Services Ltd. (Fasing Usługi Księgowe i Consultingowe Sp. z o.o.) – accounting and tax law
- Electron Poland Ltd.
- Mining Services Company Greenway Ltd. (Przedsiębiorstwo Usług Górniczych Greenway Sp. z o.o.)
