= Delphia Yachts =

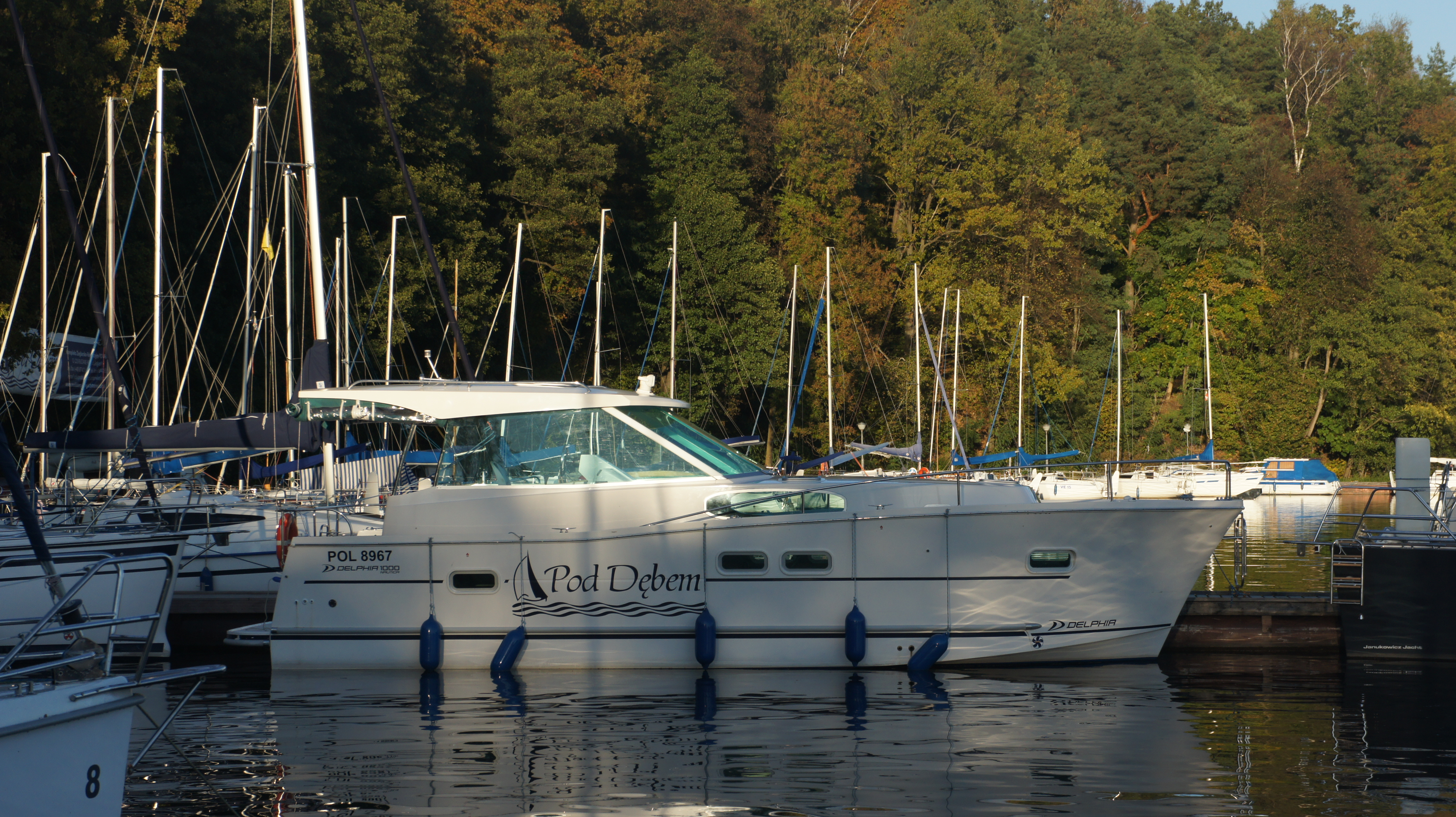
Delphia Nautika 1000

Delphia Yachts is a yacht manufacturer based in Olecko, Poland. Delphia Yachts was established in 1990 by brothers Piotr and Wojciech Kot. With a production of more 150 units per year it is Poland's largest manufacturer of sailing boats. In June 2012 Delphia Yachts acquired Maxi yachts of Sweden.

In 2018 the company was acquired by French boat manufacturer Beneteau.
