= Nowy Styl =

Company

- Type: Limited
- Industry: Furniture
- Founded: 1992
- Headquarters: Krosno, Poland,
- Key people: Adam Krzanowski, Jerzy Krzanowski, Ketil Årdal
- Brands: Nowy Styl Kusch+Co Forum by Nowy Styl Sitag by Nowy Styl SOHOS by Nowy Styl
- Number of employees: >3500 (2025)
- Website: www.nowystyl.com

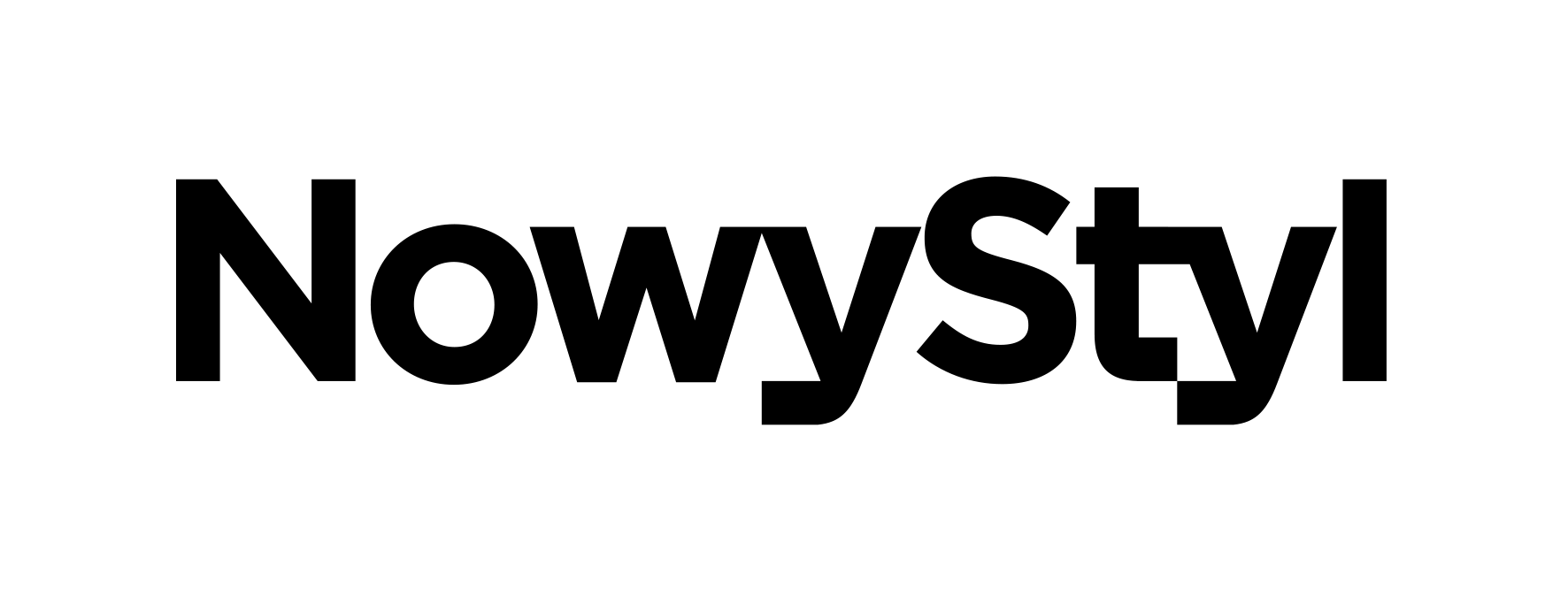

Nowy Styl sp. z o.o. is a Polish office furniture company. Founded in 1992 in Krosno in Poland as Nowy Styl (English: New Style). At that time it specialized mainly in office chairs. Today, the company sells products related to interior design, furniture and stadium seatings. With time, the company developed new brands and in 2003 Nowy Styl changed its name to the Nowy Styl Group. In 2007, the Group had PLN 930 million of sales and PLN 70 million of net income.

In February 2011 the Nowy Styl Group acquired German seating manufacturer Sato Office. In 2013, they acquired Rohde & Grahl GmbH, another German office furniture manufacturer.
