= Boryszew (company) =

Polish public company

Boryszew S.A.
- Company type: Spółka Akcyjna
- Traded as: WSE: BRS
- Industry: automotive industry metallurgy
- Founded: Boryszew, Poland (1911)
- Revenue: 5,116,006,000 złoty (2024)
- Operating income: 178,500,000 złoty (2024)
- Net income: 120,805,000 złoty (2024)
- Total assets: 3,633,569,000 złoty (2024)
- Total equity: 225 671 569.20 zł
- Number of employees: 7,280 (2024)
- Website: boryszew.com.pl

Boryszew SA (Polish pronunciation: [bɔˈrɨʂɛv]) is a Polish public company listed on the Warsaw Stock Exchange and it is on the exchange's WIG30 index of largest companies. Parts of the Boryszew group are engaged in the production of components for the automotive industry, chemical materials (including antifreeze), metal oxides and other metal elements. It is based in Sochaczew. The company owns 30 production plants in 14 countries and employs around 10,000 people.

The company's headquarters are in Warsaw.

== History ==
The history of the company dates back to 1911, when a rayon production facility was established in the Boryszew area (currently a district of Sochaczew). Before World War II, the company was involved in the production of gunpowder, materials, pharmaceuticals, cosmetics and dental cements.

Under communism, in the People's Republic of Poland, the company was involved in the production of dental materials and pharmaceuticals, coolants and brake fluids and later also, plastics.

In 1992, the company was fully privatized. Since May 1996, the company has been listed on the Warsaw Stock Exchange.

Since 2000, the company has been controlled by Roman Karkosik, a stock trader.

In 2010, the company began to expand outside of Poland, acquiring assets of Maflow group (in Italy, Poland, France, Spain, Brazil, China, India and Mexico). In 2011, it took over the German companies Theysohn, AKT and Wedo.

General income of the Boryszew group in 2012, exceeded 4,920 million złoty, and sales revenues amounted to more than 4,870 million. In 2014, a factory was opened in Russia, in 2016 in Mexico, and in 2017, in Prenzlau, Germany.

In 2019, the Alchemia S.A. Group was acquired and the steel segment commenced.
