= List of companies of Poland =

Location of Poland

Poland is a country located in Central Europe, situated between the Baltic Sea in the north and two mountain ranges (the Sudetes and Carpathian Mountains) in the south. Since the fall of communism many major companies have been established in Poland. The following list includes both fully Polish companies and foreign owned firms with independent Polish operations, such as Fiat Poland. Most of Poland's economy since communism has been developed by small and medium businesses, but large corporations still control aspects of heavy industry, mining, and chemical refining.

For further information on the types of business entities in this country and their abbreviations, see "Business entities in Poland".

== Notable firms ==
This list includes notable companies with primary headquarters located in the country. The industry and sector follow the Industry Classification Benchmark taxonomy. Organizations which have ceased operations are included and noted as defunct.

Notable companies Status: P=Private, S=State; A=Active, D=Defunct
Name	Industry	Sector	Headquarters	Founded	Notes	Status	
11 bit studios	Technology	Software	Warsaw	2010	Video games	P	A
4F	Consumer goods	Textile	Wieliczka	2007	Sportswear and casual wear products	P	A
Adamów Coal Mine	Basic materials	Coal	Turek	1979	Mining	P	A
Agora	Consumer services	Broadcasting & entertainment	Warsaw	1989	Newspapers, advertising, cinemas, radio	P	A
Alior Bank	Financials	Banks	Warsaw	2008	Universal bank	P	A
Allegro	Consumer services	E-commerce	Poznań	1999	Online auction hosting	P	A
Amica	Consumer goods	Durable household products	Wronki	1945	Household appliances	P	A
Asseco	Technology	Software	Rzeszów	1991	Financial software	P	A
Bank Millennium	Financials	Banks	Warsaw	1989	Universal bank	P	A
Bank Ochrony Środowiska	Financials	Banks	Warsaw	1991	Universal bank	S	A
Bank Pekao	Financials	Banks	Warsaw	1929	Universal bank	S	A
Belvedere Vodka	Consumer goods	Brewers	Żyrardów	1993	Brewery, part of LVMH (France)	P	A
Bełchatów Coal Mine	Basic materials	Coal	Bełchatów	1955	Coal mine	P	A
Biedronka	Consumer services	Food retailers & wholesalers	Kostrzyn	1995	Supermarkets	P	A
Black Red White	Consumer goods	Household goods	Biłgoraj	1991	Furniture	P	A
Bochnia Salt Mine	Basic materials	General mining	Bochnia	1248	Salt mine	P	A
Bogdanka Coal Mine	Basic materials	Coal	Lublin Voivodeship	1975	Coal mine	P	A
Boryszew	Automotive industry	Automotive trade	Boryszew	1911	Components for the car industry, chemical materials	P	A
BPS Group	Financials	Banks	Warsaw	2002	Cooperative banking group	P	A
Brainly	Technology	Software	Kraków	2009	Learning software	P	A
Browar Łomża	Consumer goods	Brewers	Łomża	1968	Brewery	P	A
Calatrava Capital S.A.	Financials	Joint-stock holding company	Warsaw	2000	Supervises and manages subsidiaries	P	A
CD Projekt	Technology	Software	Warsaw	1994	Video games	P	A
CI Games	Technology	Software	Warsaw	2002	Video games	P	A
Comarch	Technology	Software	Kraków	1993	Software house	P	A
Dino	Consumer services	Food retailers & wholesalers	Krotoszyn	1999	Supermarkets	P	A
E. Wedel	Consumer goods	Food & beverages	Warsaw	1851	Chocolates, cakes and snacks	P	A
Elbrewery	Consumer goods	Brewers	Elbląg	1998	Brewery	P	A
Elektrim	Industrials	Diversified industrials	Warsaw	1992	Holding company	P	A
Empik	Consumer services	General retailers	Warsaw	1967	Bookstores	P	A
Enea SA	Utilities	Conventional Electricity	Poznań	2003	Power generation	P	A
Ericpol	Technology	Software	Łódź	1991	Telecommunications software	P	A
ESky Group	Consumer services	Tourism	Katowice	2004	Travel agency, travel technology	P	A
Eurocash	Consumer services	Food retailers & wholesalers	Komorniki	1993	Supermarkets	P	A
Fablok	Industrials	Commercial vehicles & trucks	Chrzanów	1919	Railroad vehicles	P	A
Fabryka Samochodów Małolitrażowych	Consumer goods	Automobiles	Bielsko-Biała	1948	Defunct 1992	P	D
Fabryka Samochodów Osobowych	Consumer goods	Automobiles	Warsaw	1950		P	A
FASING S.A.	Industrials	Diversified industrials	Katowice	1913	Industrial chains	P	A
FŁT-Kraśnik	Industrials	Diversified industrials	Kraśnik	1938	General manufacturing	P	A
Gaworzyce mine	Basic materials	Nonferrous metals	Gaworzyce	2004	Copper and silver mine	P	A
Gaz-System	Utilities	Gas distribution	Warsaw	2004	Natural gas transmission	P	A
Głogów Głęboki-Przemysłowy mine	Basic materials	Nonferrous metals	Polkowice	2004	Copper and silver mine	P	A
Grupa Azoty	Chemical industry	Specialty chemicals	Tarnów	1927	Fertilizers, plastics, pigments	P	A
Grupa Lotos	Oil & gas	Exploration & production	Gdańsk	2003	Oil production and refining, defunct 2022 (merged with Orlen)	P	D
Gubin Coal Mine	Basic materials	Coal	Gubin	1955	Coal mine	P	A
Halemba Coal Mine	Basic materials	Coal	Ruda Śląska	1897	Coal mine	P	A
Hortex	Consumer goods	Food & beverages	Warsaw	1958	Frozen foods and fruit drinks	P	A
ING Bank Śląski	Financials	Banks	Katowice	1988	Bank, part of ING Group (Netherlands)	P	A
Inglot	Consumer goods	Cosmetics	Przemyśl	1983	Make-up products	P	A
InPost	Consumer services	Logistics	Kraków	2006	Courier, package delivery and express mail service	P	A
ITI Group	Consumer services	Broadcasting & entertainment	Warsaw	1984	Media conglomerate, defunct 2018	P	D
Jabłkowski Brothers	Consumer services	Retail	Warsaw	1884	Department stores	P	A
JSW	Basic materials	Coal	Jastrzębie-Zdrój	1993	Coal mines	P	A
K. Rudzki i S-ka	Industrials	Engineering and machinery	Warsaw	1858	Construction company	P	D
KGHM Polska Miedź	Basic materials	Nonferrous metals	Lubin	1961	Copper and silver mine	S	A
Kino Polska	Consumer services	Broadcasting & entertainment	Warsaw	2003	Television	P	A
Kłodawa Salt Mine	Basic materials	General mining	Kłodawa	1950	Salt mines	P	A
Kompania Piwowarska	Consumer goods	Brewers	Poznań	1999	Brewery, part of Asahi Breweries (Japan)	P	A
Kompania Węglowa	Basic materials	Coal	Katowice	2003	Coal mine	S	A
Kross SA	Consumer goods	Recreational products	Przasnysz	1990	Bicycles, bicycle frames	P	A
Lech Browary Wielkopolski	Consumer goods	Brewers	Poznań	1975	Brewery, part of Kompania Piwowarska	P	A
Lilpop, Rau i Loewenstein	Industrials	Engineering company	Warsaw	1818	Iron and steel production	P	D
LOT Polish Airlines	Consumer services	Airlines	Warsaw	1929	Airline, flag carrier	S	A
LPP	Consumer services	Apparel retailers	Gdańsk	1991	Retail chain, owns the fashion brands Reserved, House, Cropp, Sinsay and Mohito	P	A
Maspex	Consumer goods	Food & beverages	Wadowice	1990	Food industry	P	A
Media Expert	Consumer services	General retailers	Złotów	2002	Consumer electronics	P	A
Multikino	Consumer services	Recreational services	Warsaw	1998	Part of Vue	P	A
Netguru	Technology	Software	Poznań	2008	Software and product design	P	A
Newag	Industrials	Commercial vehicles & trucks	Nowy Sącz	1876	Railway rolling stock	P	A
Oknoplast	Consumer goods	Household goods	Kraków	1994	PVC windows, window components, doors, roller shutters	P	A
Okocim Brewery	Consumer goods	Brewers	Brzesko	1845	Brewery	P	A
Optimus S.A.	Technology	Computer hardware	Warsaw	1988	Merged with CD Projekt in 2011	P	D
Orange Polska	Telecommunications	Mobile telecommunications	Warsaw	1991	Telecom, part of Orange S.A. (France)	P	A
People Can Fly	Technology	Software	Warsaw	2002	Video games	P	A
Pesa SA	Industrials	Commercial vehicles & trucks	Bydgoszcz	1851	Railway vehicles	P	A
PGE (Polska Grupa Energetyczna)	Utilities	Conventional electricity	Warsaw	1990	State power	S	A
PGNiG (Polskie Górnictwo Naftowe i Gazownictwo)	Oil & gas	Exploration & production	Warsaw	1976	Natural gas, defunct 2023 (merged with Orlen)	P	D
PKN Orlen	Oil & gas	Exploration & production	Płock	1999	Oil refiner	P	A
PKO BP	Financials	Banks	Warsaw	1948	Bank	S	A
PKP (Polskie Koleje Państwowe)	Industrials	Railroads	Warsaw	1926	State railways	S	A
PKS (Przedsiębiorstwo Komunikacji Samochodowej)	Consumer services	Travel & tourism	Białystok	1945	Public transportation	S	A
Play	Telecommunications	Mobile telecommunications	Warsaw	2007	Mobile provider	P	A
Plus	Telecommunications	Mobile telecommunications	Warsaw	1995	Part of Polsat Box	P	A
Poczta Polska	Consumer services	Delivery services	Warsaw	1558	Postal service	S	A
Polcast Television	Consumer services	Broadcasting & entertainment	Warsaw	2006	Broadcaster	P	A
Polsat Box	Telecommunications	Mobile telecommunications	Warsaw	1999	Mobile network	P	A
Polsteam	Industrials	Delivery services	Szczecin	1951	Shipping	P	A
Pronar	Consumer goods	Machinery	Narew	1988	Agricultural mchinery	P	A
Polregio	Consumer services	Travel & tourism	Warsaw	2001	Passenger rail	P	A
PSE (Polskie Sieci Elektroenergetyczne)	Utilities	Conventional electricity	Konstancin-Jeziorna	2004	Power	S	A
Pudliszki	Consumer goods	Food & beverages	Pudliszki	1847	Fruit and vegetable processing	P	A
PZU (Powszechny Zakład Ubezpieczeń)	Financials	Full line insurance	Warsaw	1803	Insurance	S	A
Quemetica	Chemical industry	Specialty chemicals	Łódź	1945	High-end chemical products	P	A
Qumak	Technology	Software	Warsaw	1985	I/T	P	A
Romet	Consumer goods	Recreational products	Dębica	1948, revived 2006	Bicycles, bicycle frames	P	A
RTV Euro AGD	Consumer services	General retailers	Warsaw	1990	Consumer electronics	P	A
Rublon	Technology	Software	Zielona Gora	2000	Internet security	P	A
Se-ma-for	Consumer services	Broadcasting & entertainment	Łódź	1947	Television	P	A
Smyk	Consumer services	General retailers	Warsaw	2000	Department stores and toys	P	A
Solaris Bus & Coach	Industrials	Commercial vehicles & trucks	Bolechowo	2001	Bus manufacturer	P	A
Studio Filmów Rysunkowych	Consumer services	Broadcasting & entertainment	Bielsko-Biała	1947	Television	P	A
Studio Miniatur Filmowych	Consumer services	Broadcasting & entertainment	Warsaw	1958	Television	P	A
Tauron Polska Energia	Utilities	Conventional electricity	Katowice	2006	Power generation	S	A
Techland	Technology	Software	Wrocław	1991	Video games	P	A
Tele-Fonika Kable	Industrials	Diversified industrials	Bydgoszcz	1920	Cable manufacturer	P	A
Telewizja Polska	Consumer services	Broadcasting & entertainment	Warsaw	1952	Public broadcasting	S	A
Text	Technology	Software	Wrocław	2002	AI and customer service software	P	A
T-Mobile Polska	Telecommunications	Mobile telecommunications	Warsaw	1996	Mobile network, part of Deutsche Telekom (Germany)	P	A
TVN24	Consumer services	Broadcasting & entertainment	Warsaw	2001	TV channel, part of TVN Group	P	A
TVN 7	Consumer services	Broadcasting & entertainment	Warsaw	2002	TV channel, part of TVN Group	P	A
TVN Group	Consumer services	Broadcasting & entertainment	Warsaw	1995	Media group, includes TVN	P	A
Tymbark	Consumer goods	Food & beverages	Tymbark	1936	Soft drinks	P	A
Unitra	Consumer goods	Audio and video equipment	Warsaw	1961	Audio and video equipment	P	A
Ursus SA	Automotive industry	Agricultural machinery	Lublin	1893	Tractors	P	A
Van Pur	Consumer goods	Brewers	Rakszawa	1989	Brewery holding	P	A
Vulcan	Technology	Software	Wrocław	1988	Software for the education sector	P	A
Wieliczka Salt Mine	Consumer services	Recreational services	Wieliczka	1252	Former salt mine, now attraction	P	A
Wielton	Automotive industry	Utility vehicles	Wieluń	1996	Trailers	P	A
Żabka	Consumer services	Food retailers & wholesalers	Poznań	1998	Grocery	P	A
ZMT SA	Industrials	Defense	Tarnów	1917	Firearms, weapons	P	A
Zortrax	Technology	Diversified industrials	Olsztyn	2013	3D printers and filaments	P	A
Żubrówka	Consumer goods	Brewers	Białystok	–	Brewery	P	A
Żywiec Brewery	Consumer goods	Brewers	Żywiec	1856	Brewery	P	A

== See also ==
- List of railway companies in Poland
- Economy of Poland
- List of largest Polish companies
- List of mines in Poland
