= Mieszków =

Mieszków may refer to the following places in Poland:

- Mieszków, Lower Silesian Voivodeship (south-west Poland)
- Mieszków, Greater Poland Voivodeship (west-central Poland)
- Mieszków, Lubusz Voivodeship (west Poland)
