= Dzików =

Dzików may refer to the following places in Poland:

- Dzików, Tarnobrzeg, a district of the town of Tarnobrzeg, Subcarpathian Voivodeship (SE Poland)
- Dzików, Lower Silesian Voivodeship (south-west Poland)
- Dzików, Pomeranian Voivodeship (north Poland)
