= Gostyń (disambiguation) =

Gostyń may refer to:

- Gostyń, a town in Greater Poland Voivodeship (west-central Poland)
- Gostyń, Lower Silesian Voivodeship (south-west Poland)
- Gostyń, Silesian Voivodeship (south Poland)
- Gostyń, West Pomeranian Voivodeship (north-west Poland)
- Gostyn, Illinois, a neighborhood, United States
