= Witanowice =

Witanowice may refer to the following places in Poland:

- Witanowice, Lower Silesian Voivodeship (south-west Poland)
- Witanowice, Lesser Poland Voivodeship (south Poland)
