= Koźlice, Polkowice County =

Koźlice
- Village
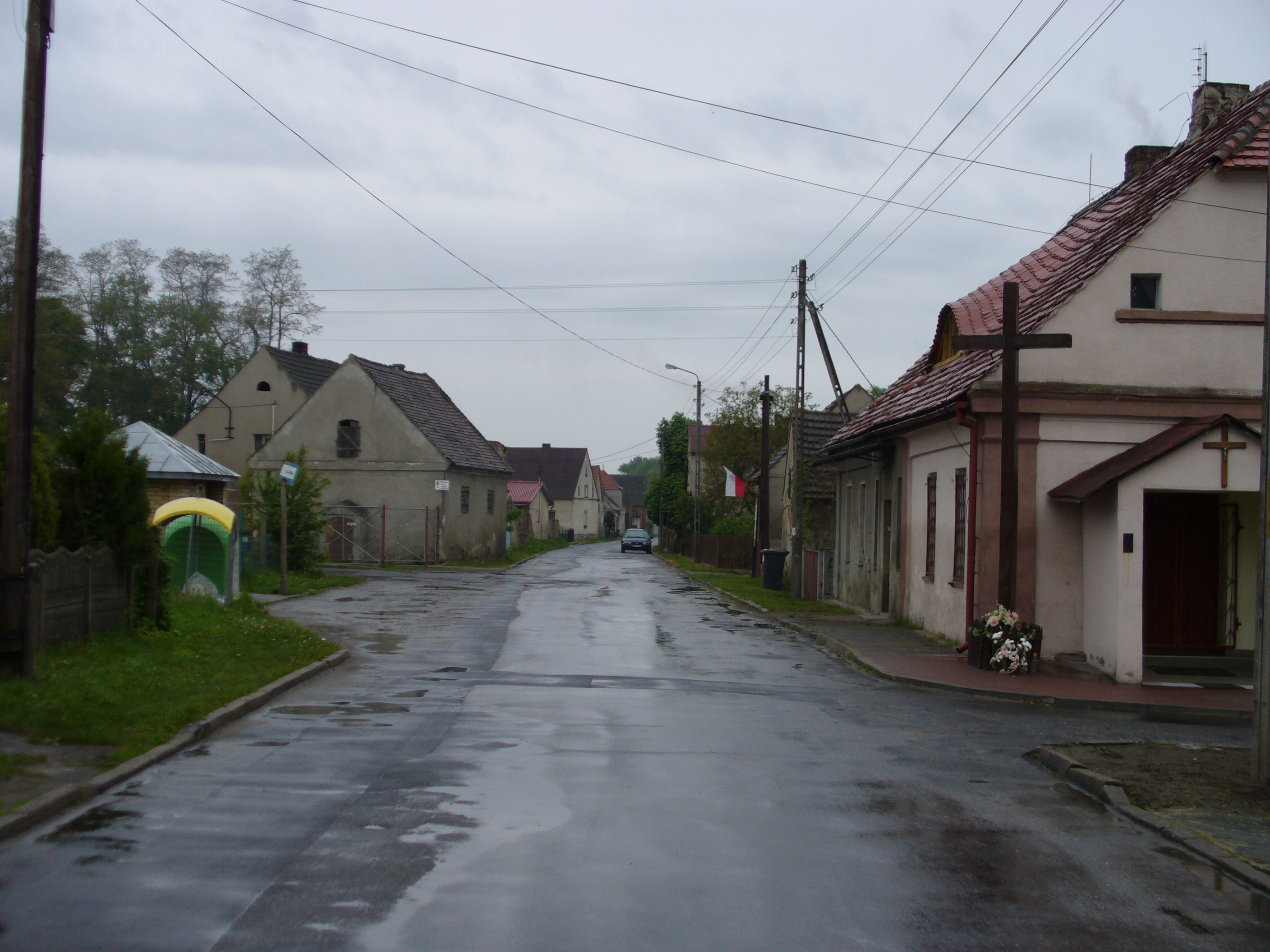

- Location within Poland
- Coordinates: 51°36′N 15°54′E
- Country: Poland
- Voivodeship: Lower Silesian
- County: Polkowice
- Gmina: Gaworzyce
- Population (approx.): 300

Koźlice [kɔˈʑlit͡sɛ] is a village in the administrative district of Gmina Gaworzyce, within Polkowice County, Lower Silesian Voivodeship, in south-western Poland.
