= Kłobuczyn =

- Village
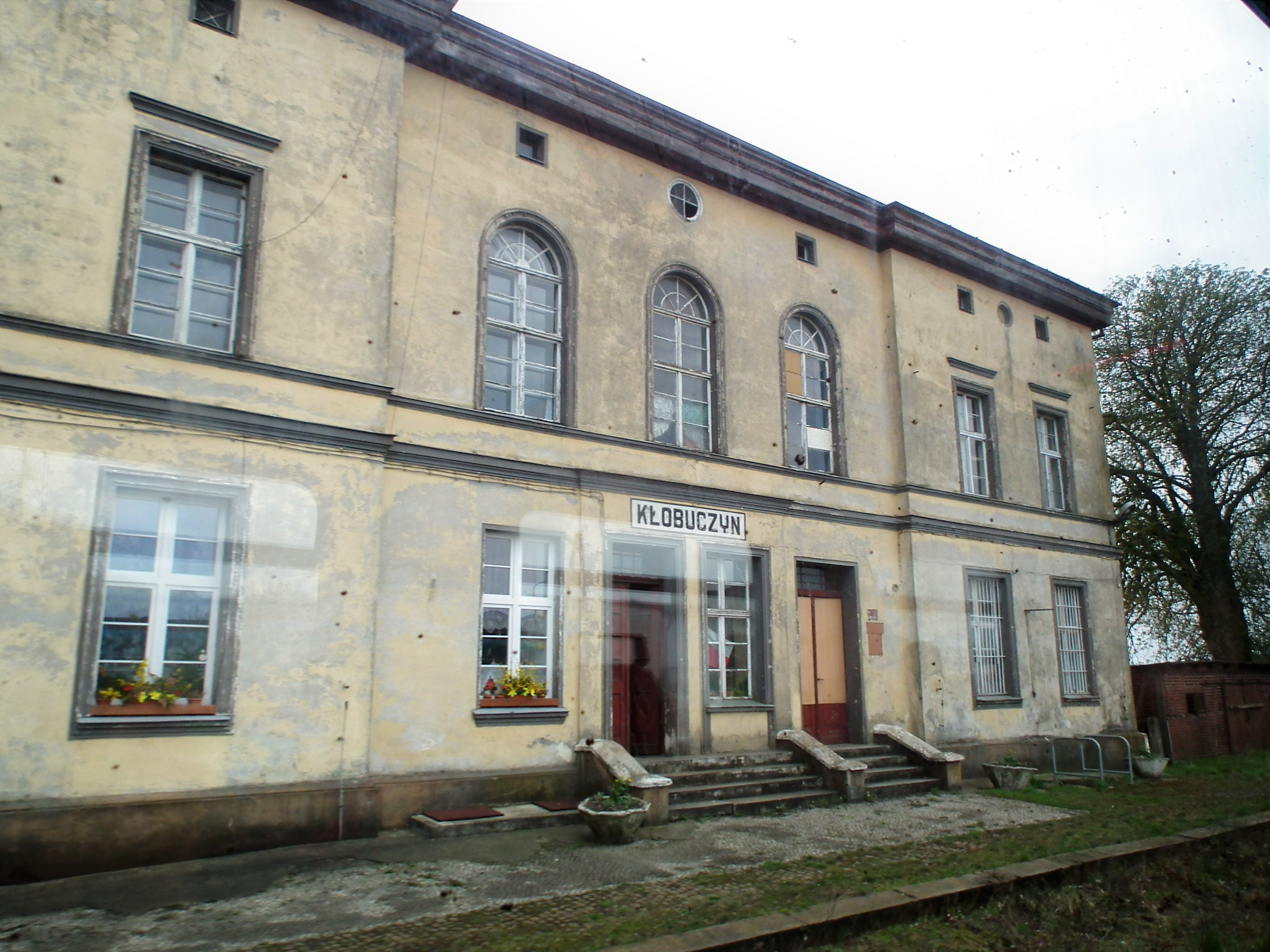
- Train station

- Location within Poland
- Coordinates: 51°36′51″N 15°55′39″E
- Country: Poland
- Voivodeship: Lower Silesian
- County: Polkowice
- Gmina: Gaworzyce

Kłobuczyn [kwɔˈbut͡ʂɨn](German: Klopschen) is a village in the administrative district of Gmina Gaworzyce, within Polkowice County, Lower Silesian Voivodeship, in south-western Poland.
