= Gmina Gaworzyce =

Gmina Gaworzyce Gaworzyce Commune
- Gmina
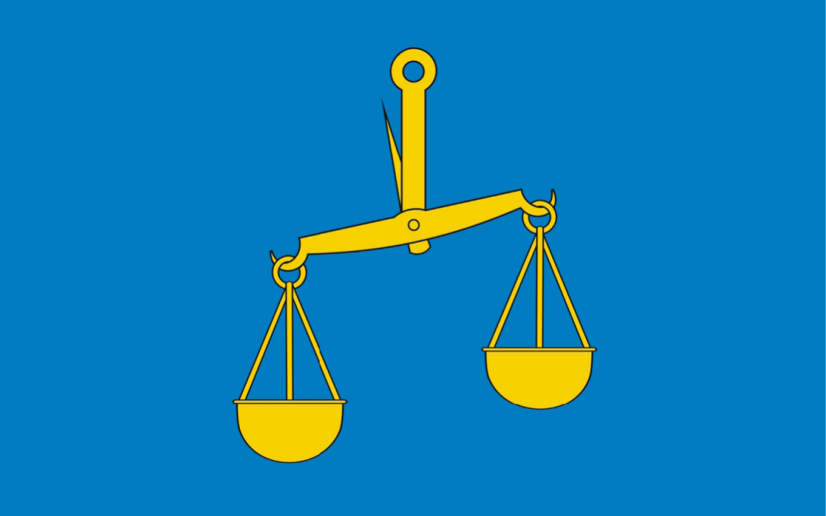
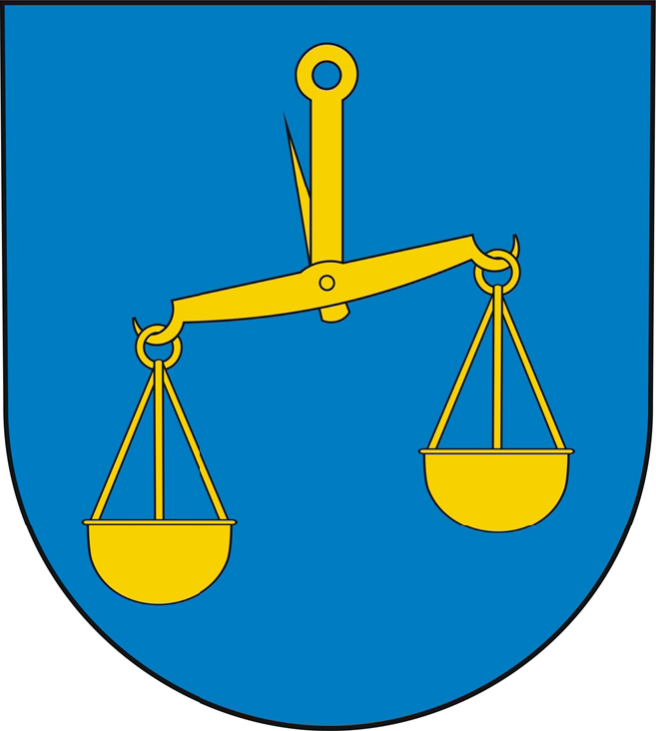
- Flag Coat of arms

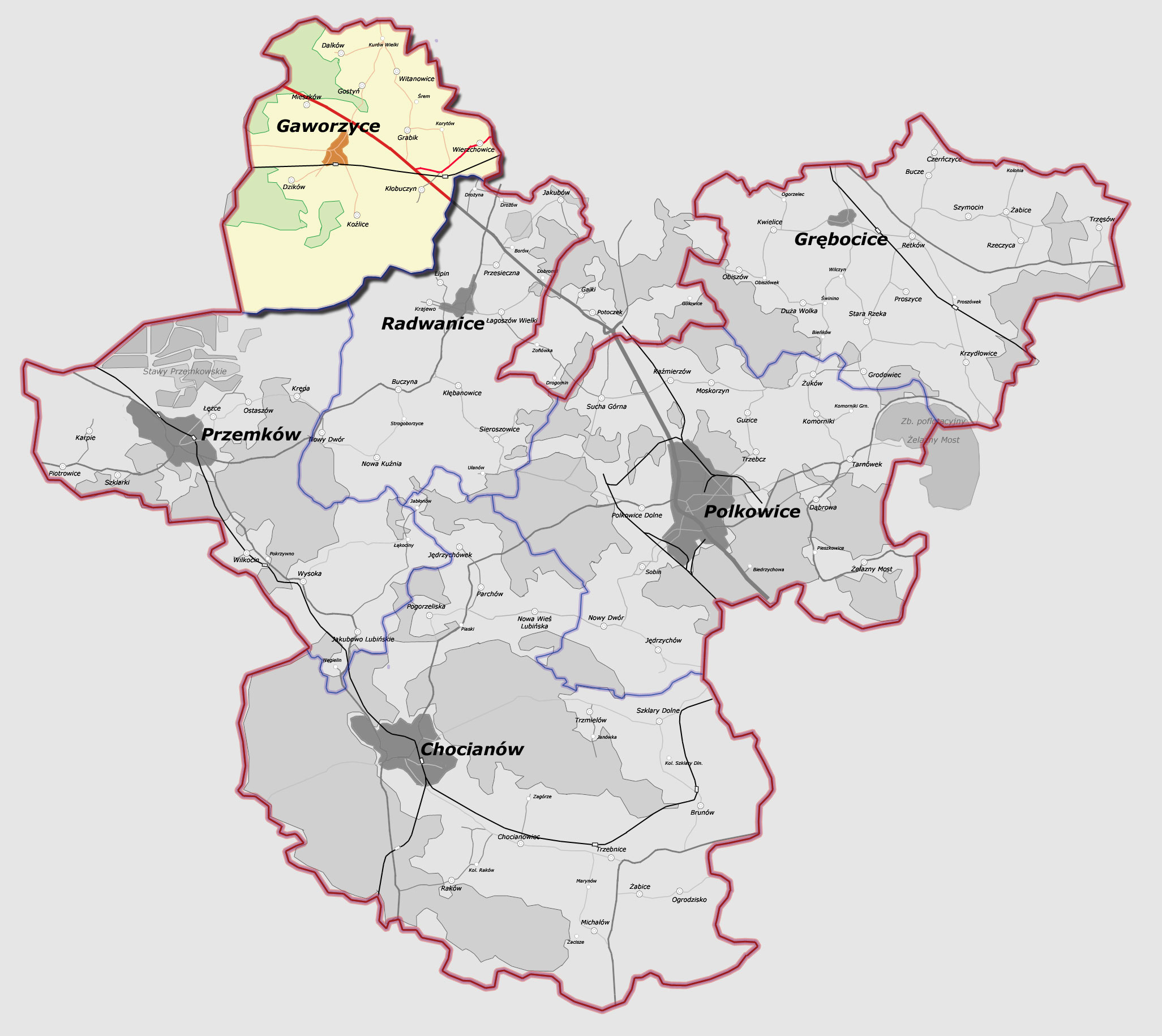
- Coordinates (Gaworzyce): 51°37′41″N 15°52′50″E
- Country: Poland
- Voivodeship: Lower Silesian
- County: Polkowice
- Seat: Gaworzyce

Area
  - Total: 76.99 km^{2} (29.73 sq mi)

Population (2019-06-30)
  - Total: 3,997
  - Density: 51.92/km^{2} (134.5/sq mi)
- Website: http://www.gaworzyce.com.pl/

Gmina Gaworzyce is a rural gmina (administrative district) in Polkowice County, Lower Silesian Voivodeship, in south-western Poland. Its seat is the village of Gaworzyce, which lies approximately 20 kilometres (12 mi) north-west of Polkowice, and 98 kilometres (61 mi) north-west of the regional capital Wrocław.

The gmina covers an area of 76.99 square kilometres (29.7 sq mi), and as of 2019 its total population is 3,997.

== Neighbouring gminas ==
Gmina Gaworzyce is bordered by the gminas of Niegosławice, Przemków, Radwanice and Żukowice.

== Villages ==
The gmina contains the villages of Dalków, Dzików, Gaworzyce, Gostyń, Grabik, Kłobuczyn, Korytów, Koźlice, Kurów Wielki, Mieszków, Śrem, Wierzchowice and Witanowice.
