= Wierzchowice, Polkowice County =

Wierzchowice
- Village
- Location within Poland
- Coordinates: 51°37′50″N 15°57′37″E
- Country: Poland
- Voivodeship: Lower Silesian
- County: Polkowice
- Gmina: Gaworzyce
- Population: 500

Wierzchowice [vjɛʂxɔˈvit͡sɛ] (German: Würchwitz) is a village in the administrative district of Gmina Gaworzyce, within Polkowice County, Lower Silesian Voivodeship, in south-western Poland.
