= Korytów, Polkowice County =

Korytów
- Village
- Location within Poland
- Coordinates: 51°38′04″N 15°56′17″E
- Country: Poland
- Voivodeship: Lower Silesian
- County: Polkowice
- Gmina: Gaworzyce

Korytów [kɔˈrɨtuf] is a village in the administrative district of Gmina Gaworzyce, within Polkowice County, Lower Silesian Voivodeship, in south-western Poland.
