= Gaworzyce mine =

Copper mine in Poland

- Location: Gaworzyce, Polkowice County, Poland
- Products: Copper
- Opened: 2004
- Company: KGHM Polska Miedź

The Gaworzyce mine is a large mine in the west of Poland in Gaworzyce, Polkowice County, 370 km south-west of the capital, Warsaw. Gaworzyce represents one of the largest copper and silver reserve in Poland having estimated reserves of 44.8 million tonnes of ore grading 3.05% copper and 44 g/tonnes silver. The annual ore production is around 1 million tonnes from which 30,500 tonnes of copper and 44 tonnes of silver are extracted.
