= Qumak =

Polish IT and technology company

Qumak S.A.
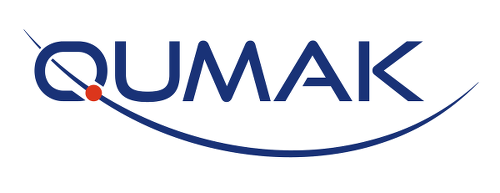

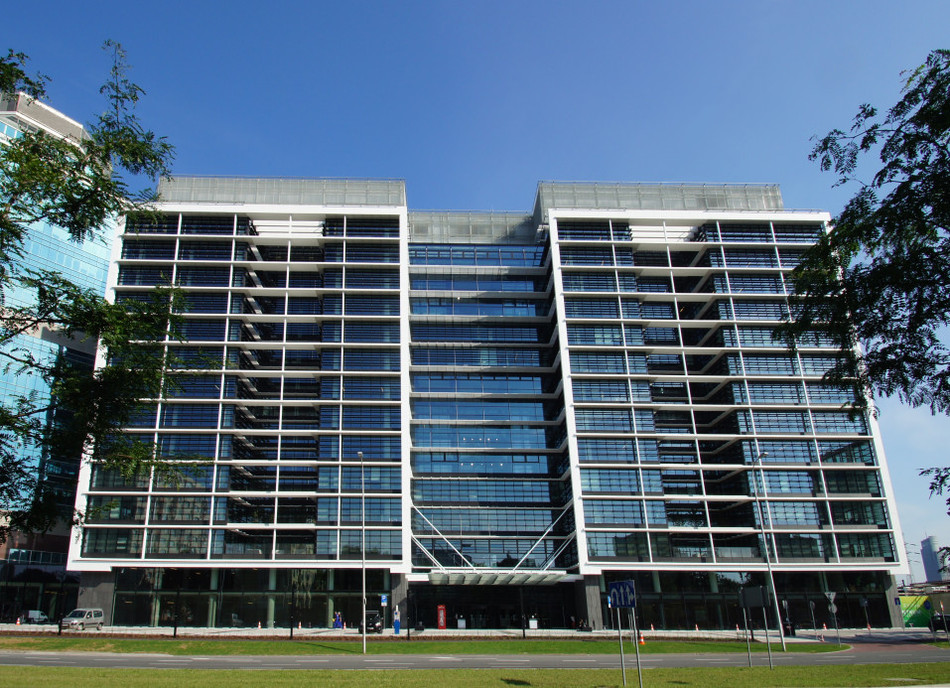
- Qumak headquarters, Eurocentrum Office, in Warsaw
- Company type: Joint-stock company
- Traded as: WSE: QMK
- Industry: ICT
- Predecessor: Qumak International; Sekom SA; Qumak-Sekom SA
- Founded: 1985; 41 years ago, Poland
- Headquarters: Warsaw, Poland
- Number of locations: Gdańsk; Kraków
- Key people: Tomasz Laudy (President of the Management Board); Marek Tiahnybok (Vice President of the Management Board); Jacek Suchenek (Vice President of the Management Board); Wojciech Strusiński (Vice President of the Management Board)
- Revenue: 708,8 million PLN (2015)
- Operating income: -9,7 million PLN
- Net income: -9,8 million PLN
- Number of employees: 700+

Qumak S.A. is a Polish company that develops information and communications technology. Qumak also collaborates with fifty technology companies to develop products. Since 3 August 2006, the company has been listed on the Warsaw Stock Exchange.

The Qumak company has been cooperating with universities and research centers for years. It has implemented projects for institutions such as AGH University of Science and Technology in Kraków, the Jan Kochanowski University in Kielce, the Warsaw University of Technology and the University of Warsaw.

== History ==
The beginnings of the company dates back to second half of the 80s. In 1985, a company which manufactured and repaired electronic devices was created. In December 1997, the company was registered as Sekom S. A.

PHP Quamak Sp. z o.o was established in 1988. At first it sold computers and offered maintenance service. In July 1990, it opened a first computer and gadgets shop in the centre of Kraków. For further development, the company needed financial assets. Polish-American Enterprise Fund (PAEF), first venture capital fund, offered its support. As a result of arrangement made between the fund and the company, a joint venture company Qumak International Sp. z o.o. was set up in 1990/9.

In 1998, Sekom S.A. in agreement with Qumak International Sp. z o.o. created Sekom Group. It consisted also of two smaller companies: Blue-Bridge Sp. z o.o. and Gandalf Polska Sp z o.o.Thanks to the cooperation of entities specialized in various IT industries (security systems, video conferences systems) the group became an IT integrator with wide offer of services.

In 2002, the companies belonging to Sekom Group merged into one entity, Qumak-Sekom S.A. The new company became one of the most powerful Polish IT companies. The headquarters was located in Warsaw, in addition the company also held a big branch in Cracow and offices in Bielsko-Biała, Gdańsk, Radom and Poznań. The company's structure was based on three areas: integration, IT and building automation.

On 3 August 2006, Qumak-Sekom S.A. was quoted on Warsaw Stock Exchange.

In September 2012, the company adopted a new strategy for years 2013–2016. Its offer was adjusted in order to eliminate the least viable and least prospective lines of business. In January 2013, the company registered a new, shortened name and since then it has been operating as Qumak S.A. Currently, it has headquarters in Warsaw and branches in two cities, in Cracow and a smaller one in Gdańsk.

25 October 2018, The Management Board makes a decision on the preparation of a bankruptcy petition for Qumak S.A.

== See also ==
- Clicktrans
- Synerise
