= RTV Euro AGD =

Polish retail chain

Euro-net sp. z o.o.
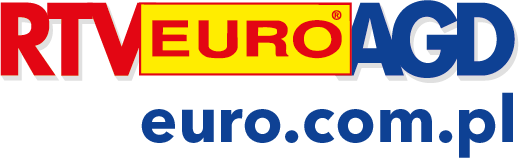

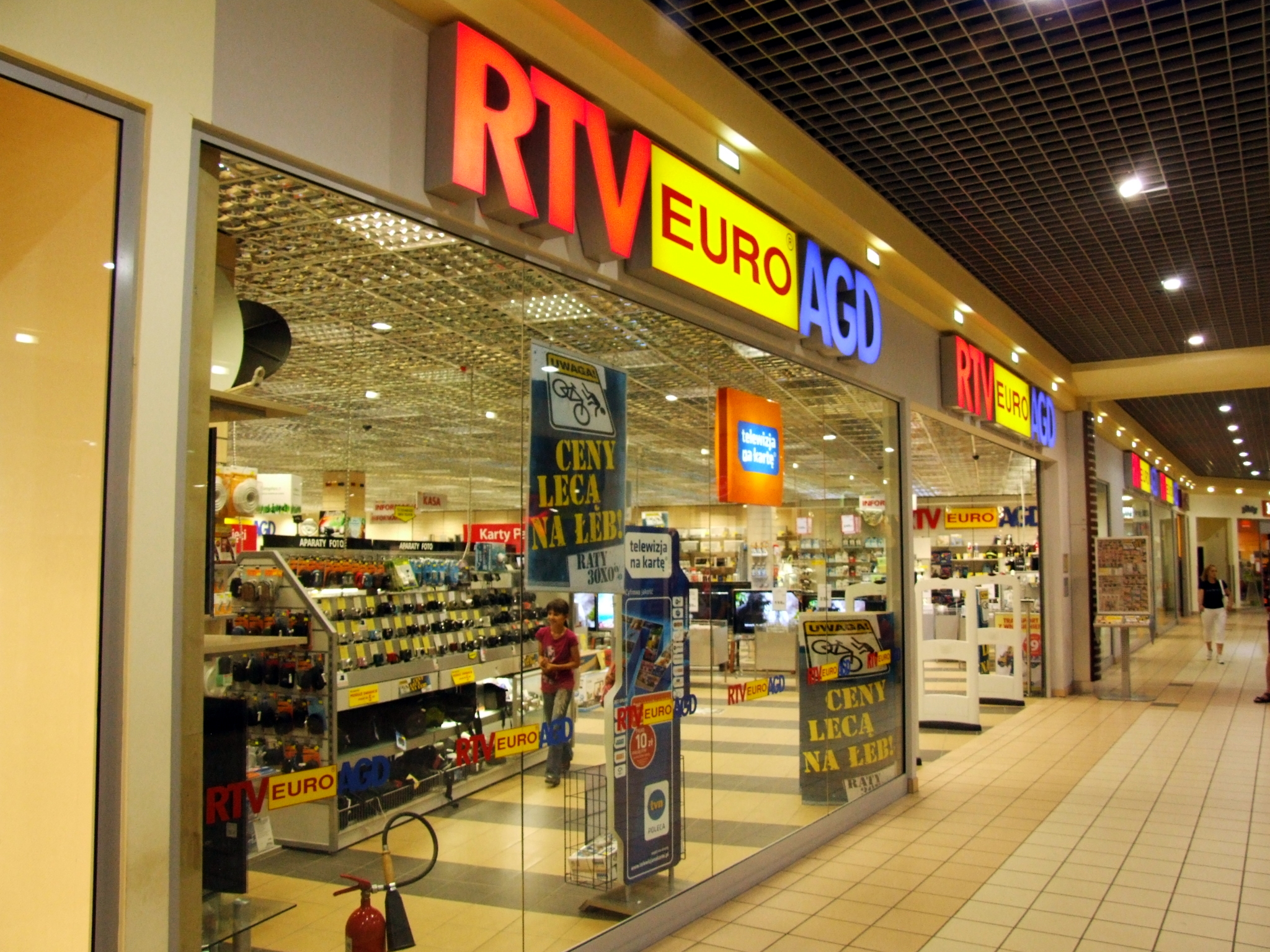
- Trade name: RTV Euro AGD
- Type: Private
- Industry: Retail
- Founded: 1990
- Founder: Robert Kuczyński; Iwona Kuk; Waldemar Kuk
- Headquarters: Warsaw, Poland
- Products: Consumer electronics
- Revenue: 1,597,000,000 (2018)
- Net income: 28,500,000 (2018)
- Number of employees: 6,308 (2018)
- Website: www.euro.com.pl

RTV Euro AGD is a trading name of a Polish company Euro-net sp. z o.o. In Poland, the company is commonly referred to as 'EURO'. RTV in Polish means "Consumer electronics", and AGD means "Household appliance".

== History ==
The company started selling consumer electronics and home appliances in 1991, initially operating in Warsaw and its vicinity. Currently, Euro-net has 277 shops in 177 cities all around Poland. The shops are usually located in the biggest shopping centers. The company is also selling on the web and by telephone.

Its biggest competitor in Poland is Media Markt. Euro-net is the 9th biggest privately held company in Poland with yearly sales of 4.5 bln PLN (1.1 bln USD) in 2015. The total value of the consumer electronics and home appliances market in Poland in 2015 was 23.2 bln PLN.

Euro-net was fined over 0.5 mln PLN in 2013 by a national consumer watchdog UOKiK for deceitful advertising

Euro-net should not be confused with Euronet Worldwide, which is a popular network of ATMs in Poland.

== Gallery ==
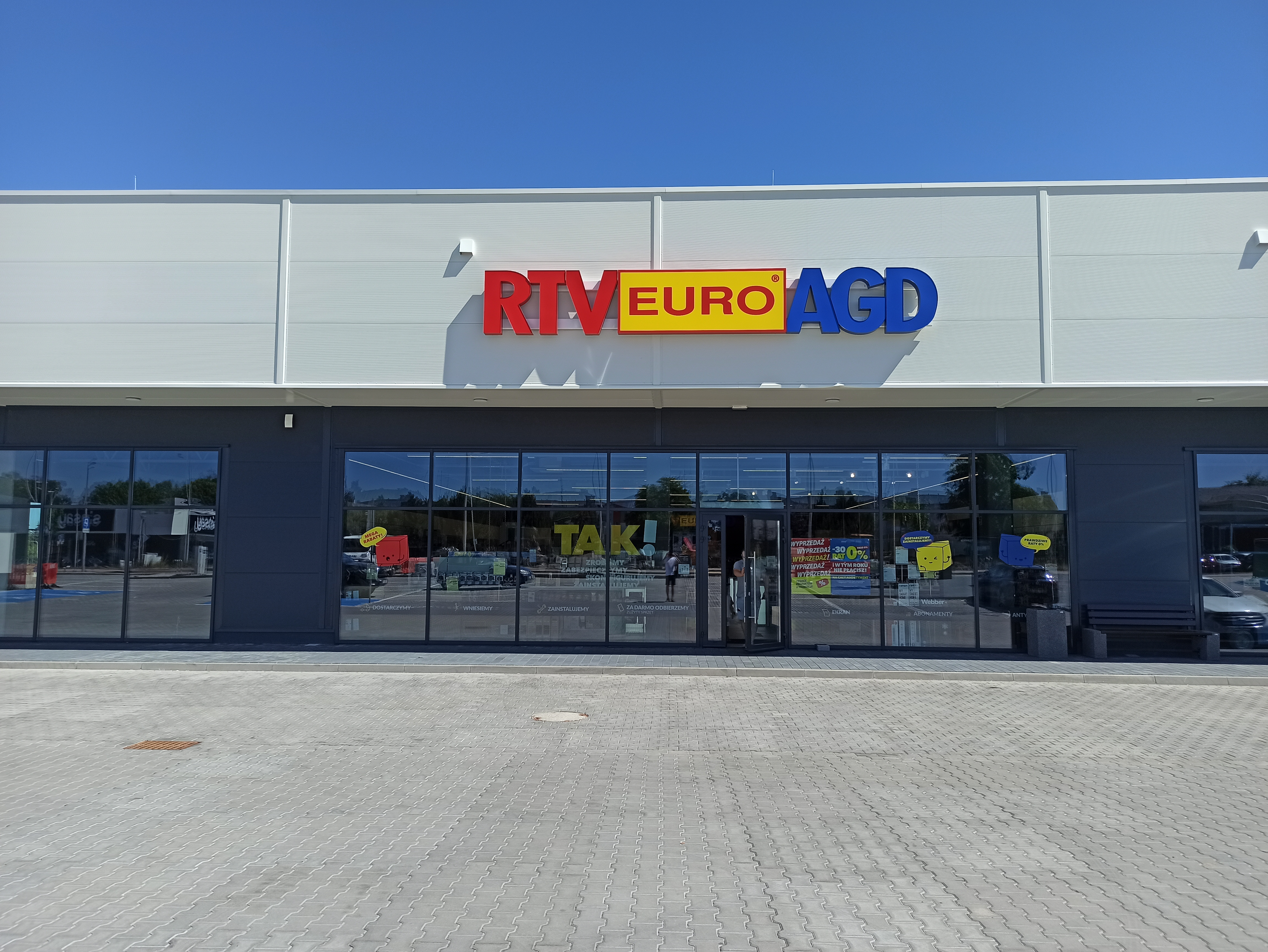
A RTV Euro AGD store in Prudnik

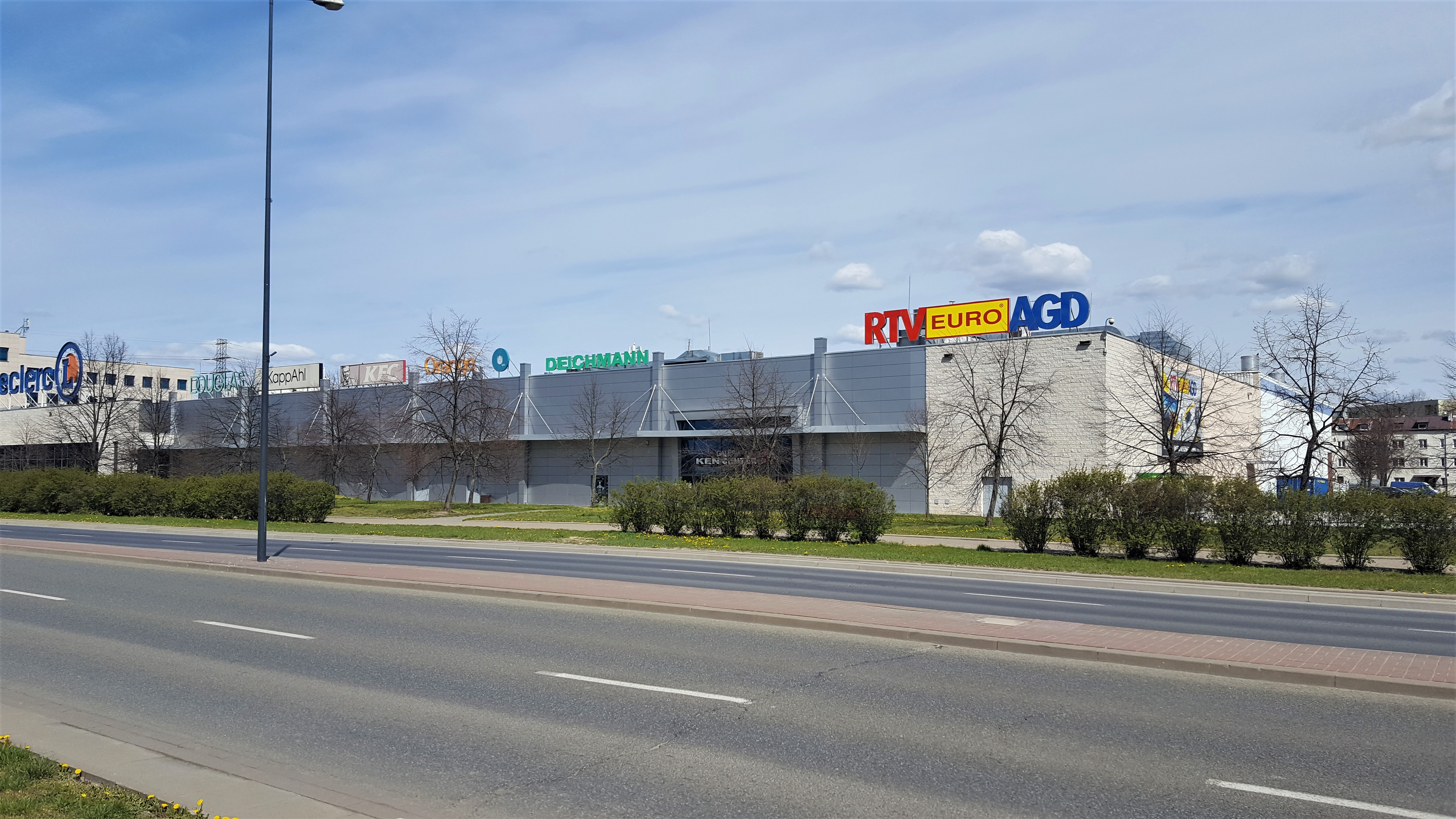
A RTV Euro AGD store in Warsaw

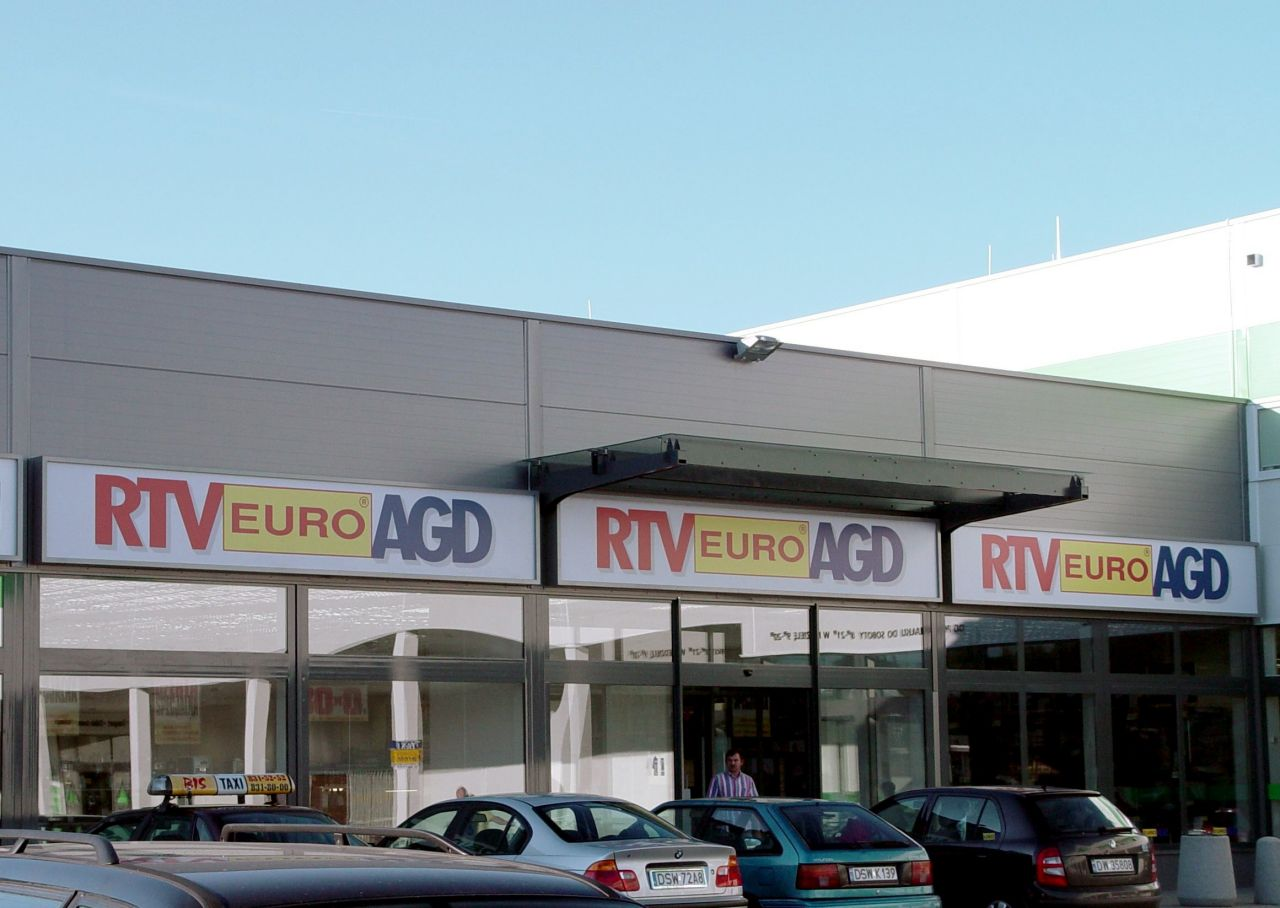
A RTV Euro AGD store in Świdnica

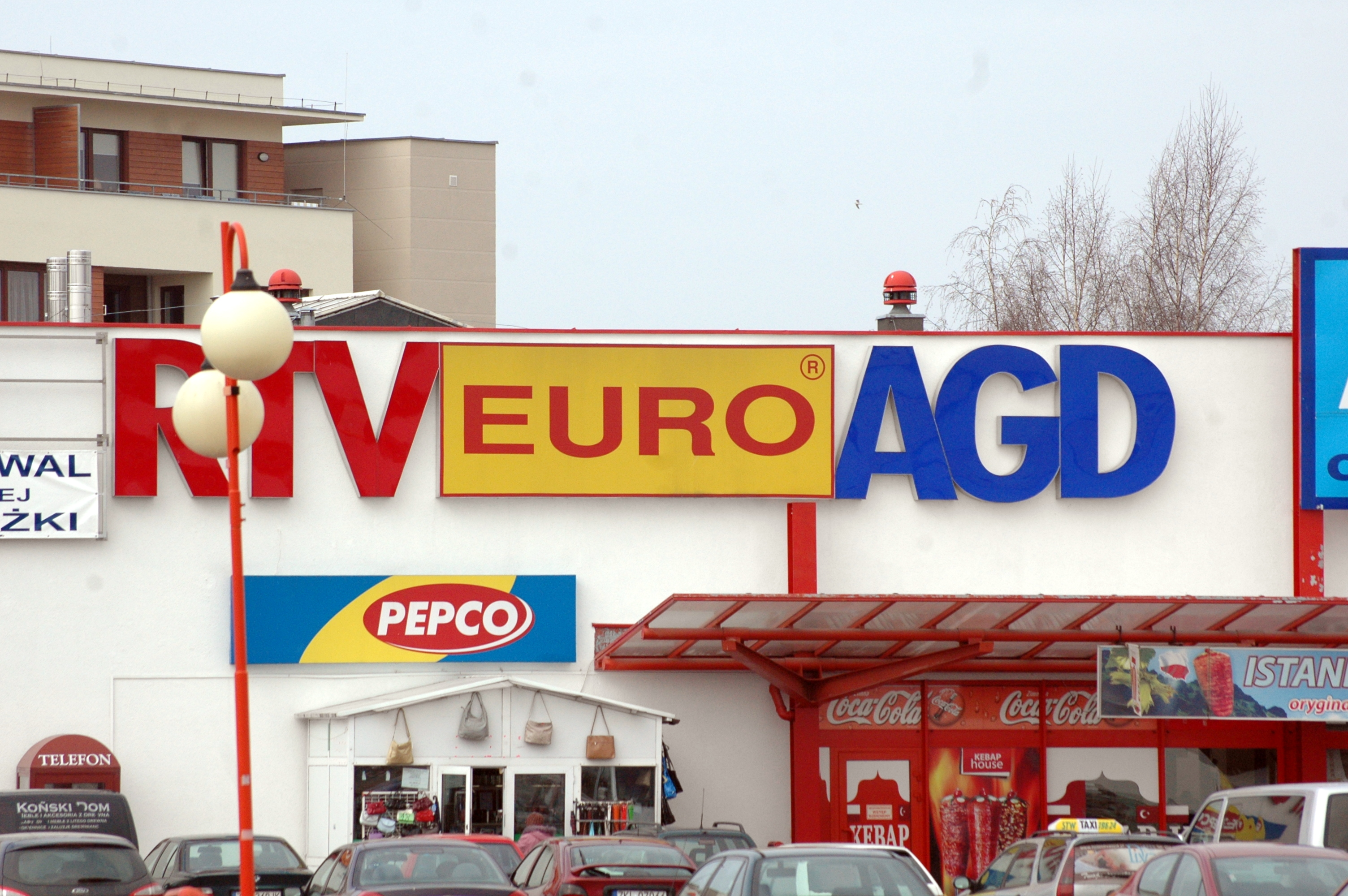
A RTV Euro AGD store in Kołobrzeg

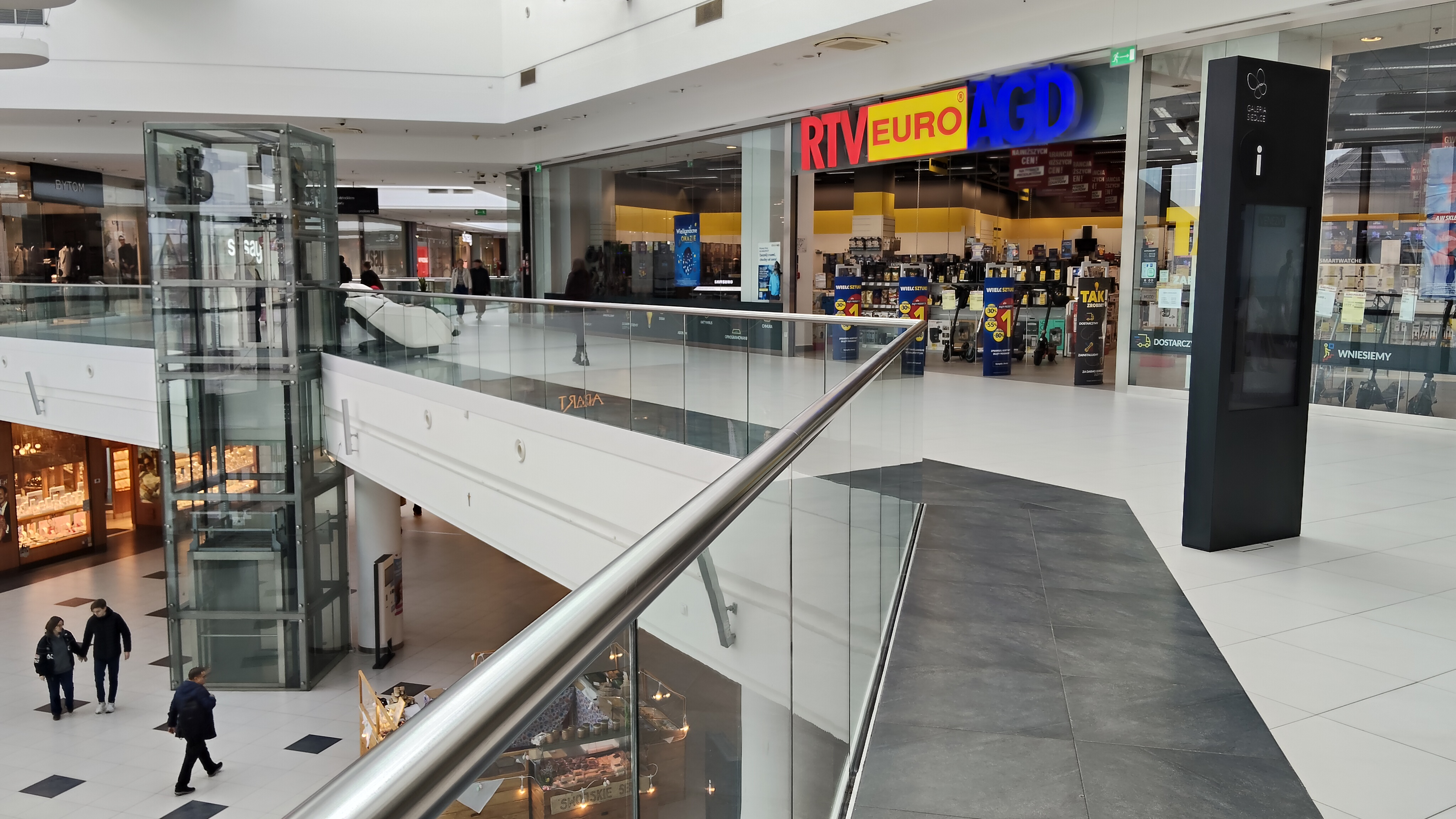
A RTV Euro AGD store in a shopping center in Siedlce

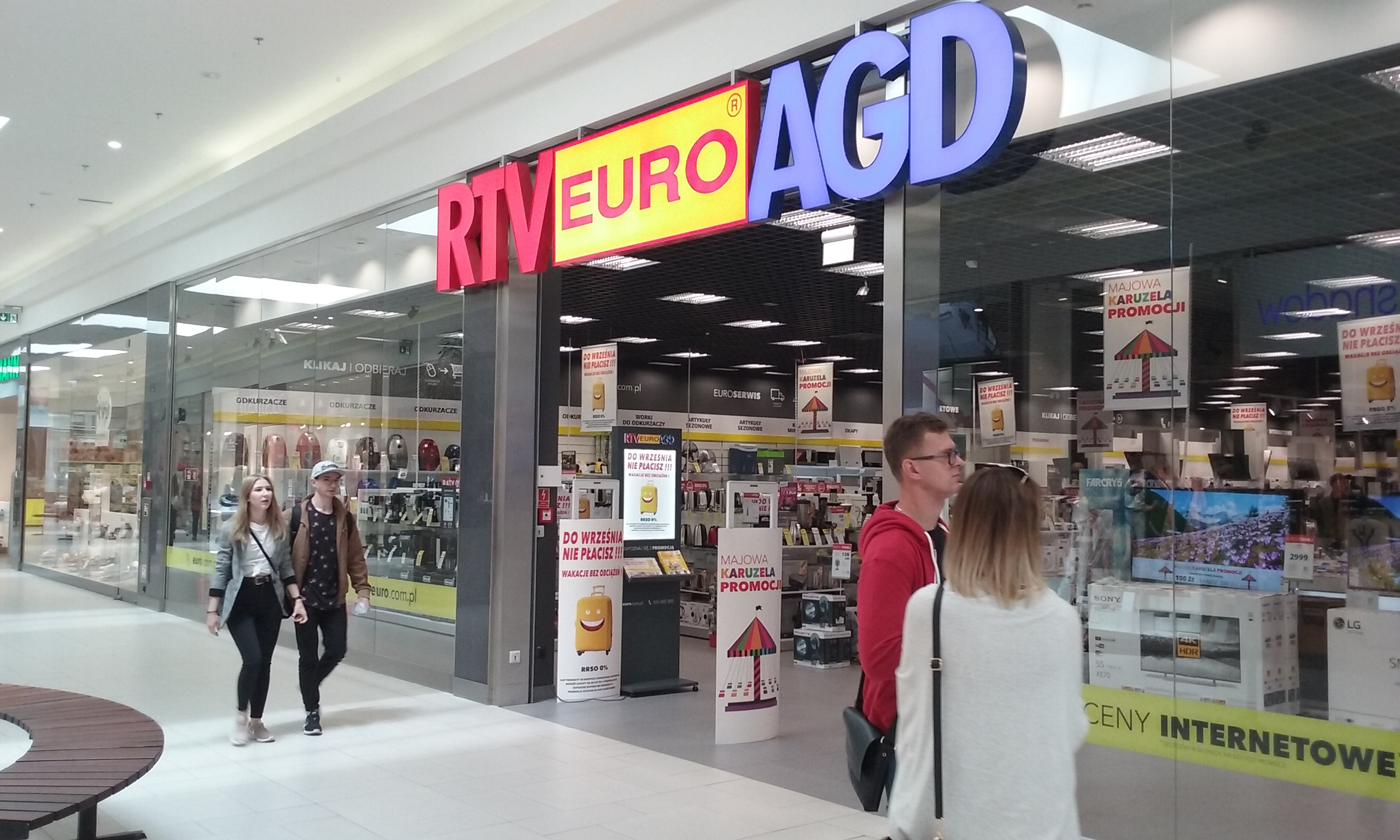
A RTV Euro AGD store in a shopping center in Tomaszów Mazowiecki

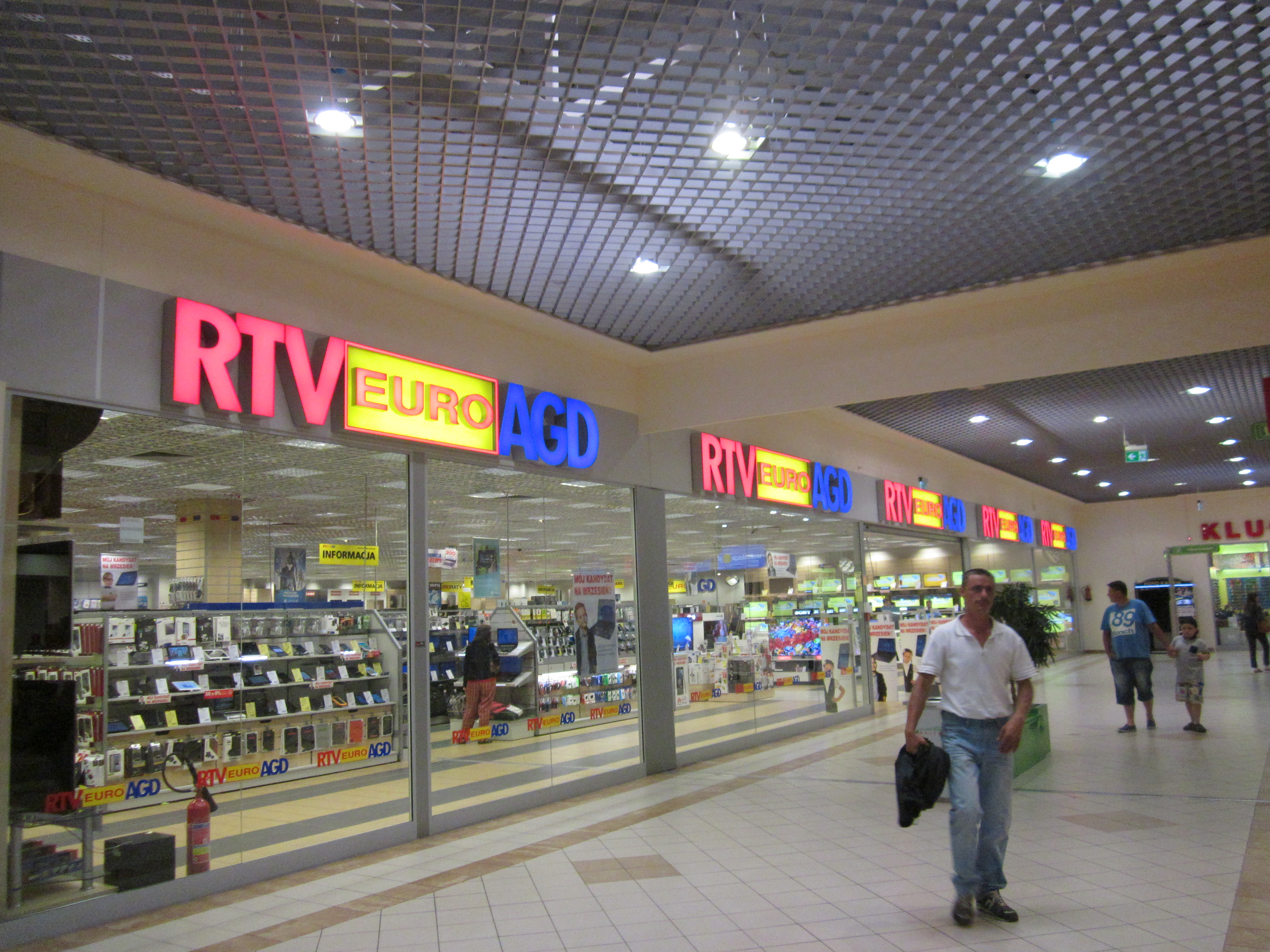
A RTV Euro AGD store in a shopping center in Białystok

== See also ==
- Economy of Poland
- List of Polish companies

== Bibliography ==
- ETC Gdańsk (Polish) Store no. 11 EURO - net (approx. 800 sq m)
