= Dalków, Lower Silesian Voivodeship =

Dalków
- Village
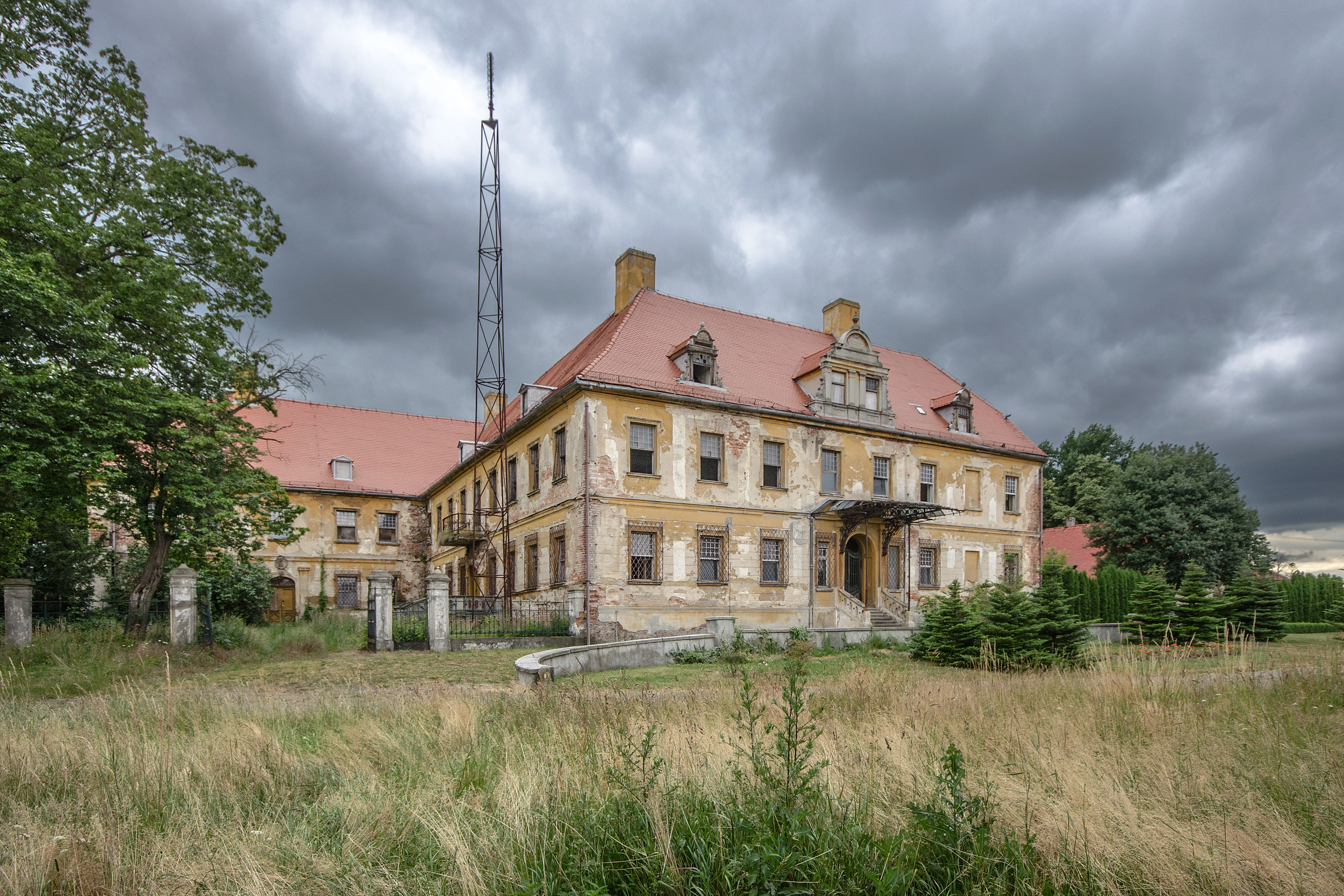
- Palace

- Location within Poland
- Coordinates: 51°39′42″N 15°53′16″E
- Country: Poland
- Voivodeship: Lower Silesian
- County: Polkowice
- Gmina: Gaworzyce

Dalków [ˈdalkuf] is a village in the administrative district of Gmina Gaworzyce, within Polkowice County, Lower Silesian Voivodeship, in south-western Poland.
