= Śrem, Polkowice County =

Śrem
- Village
- Location within Poland
- Coordinates: 51°38′41″N 15°55′35″E
- Country: Poland
- Voivodeship: Lower Silesian
- County: Polkowice
- Gmina: Gaworzyce

Śrem [ɕrɛm] is a village in the administrative district of Gmina Gaworzyce, within Polkowice County, Lower Silesian Voivodeship, in south-western Poland.
