= Kross SA =

Polish bicycle manufacturer

- Industry: Bicycles
- Founded: 1990; 36 years ago
- Headquarters: Przasnysz, Poland
- Key people: Zbigniew Sosnowski
- Products: Bicycle and Related Components
- Revenue: 394 zł million €86.3 million (2021)
- Number of employees: 426 (2013)
- Website: www.kross.pl

Kross is a Polish sports industry company which specializes in manufacturing bicycles and bicycle frames. The company is currently the largest in Poland manufacturing bicycles sold in the Polish market. In 2005 the company sold almost 800,000 products, half of which were exported to 35 countries, 30 of which are in Europe.

== History ==
The company was founded in 1990 when Zbigniew Sosnowski opened a bike shop in Przasnysz, which soon turned into a warehouse and assembly plant for bicycles. With time, and the right investments, the company has become a thriving manufacturer of bicycles, originally sold under the Grand brand, and from 2003 – Kross. Since 2004, they also own and manufacture the Zipp brand of scooters.

In February 2017, the company acquired the Dutch brand Multicycle, which specializes in electric bicycles.

In 2018, the company manufactured a total of 275,000 bicycles. In 2020 the bicycles were exported to 50 countries around the world.

== Products ==
The company has in its collection, several groups of bicycles designed for different applications:

- Level – mountain bikes intended for Cross-country (XC)
- Hexagon – mountain bikes intended for tourism and recreation
- XC Full – FS mountain bikes intended for Cross–country (XC)
- Vento – road bikes
- Multicycle – E-Bikes
- Le Grand – city bikes
- Inzai, Seto, Noru – urban bikes
- Trans – trekking and tourism bikes
- children bikes

== Gallery ==
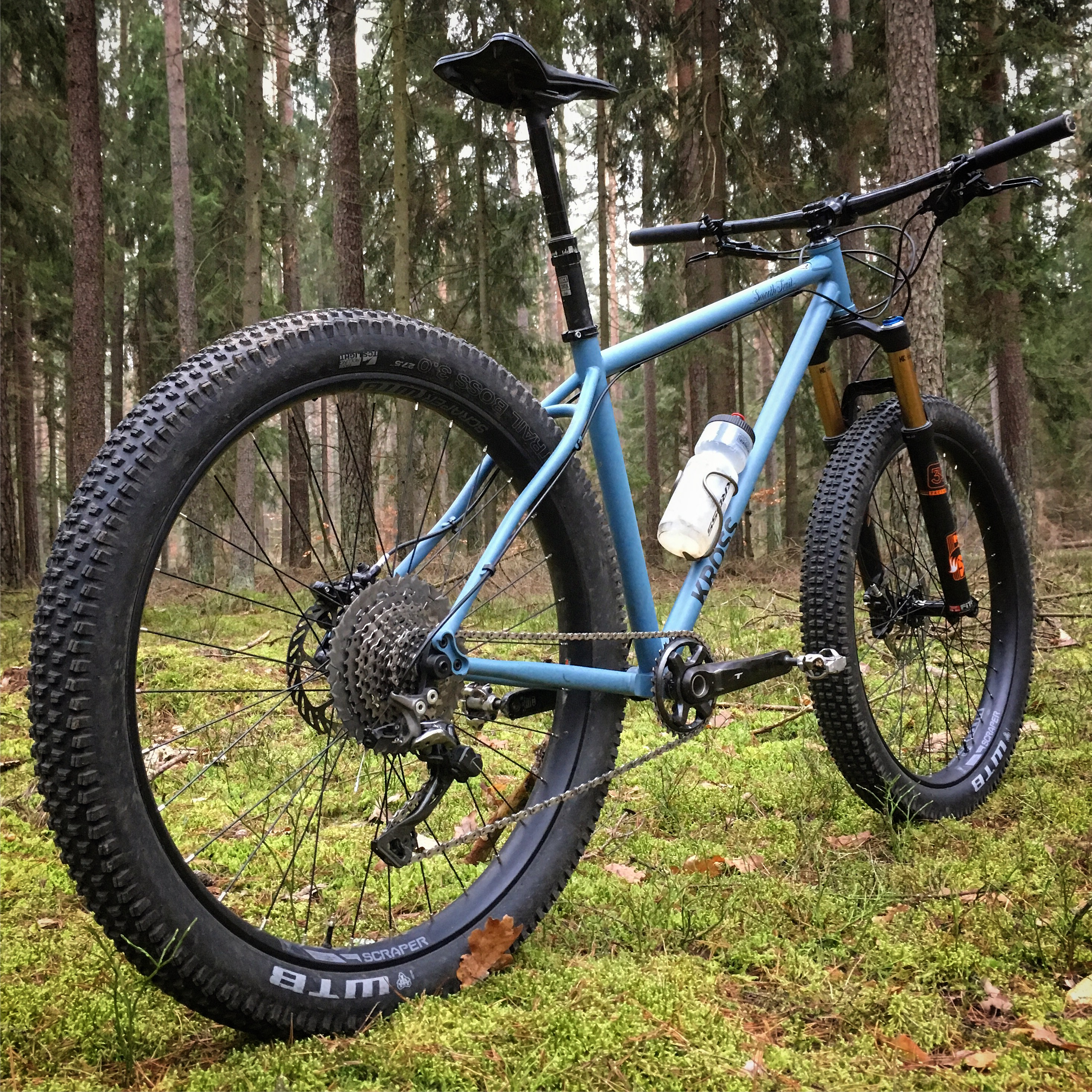
Kross Smooth Trail

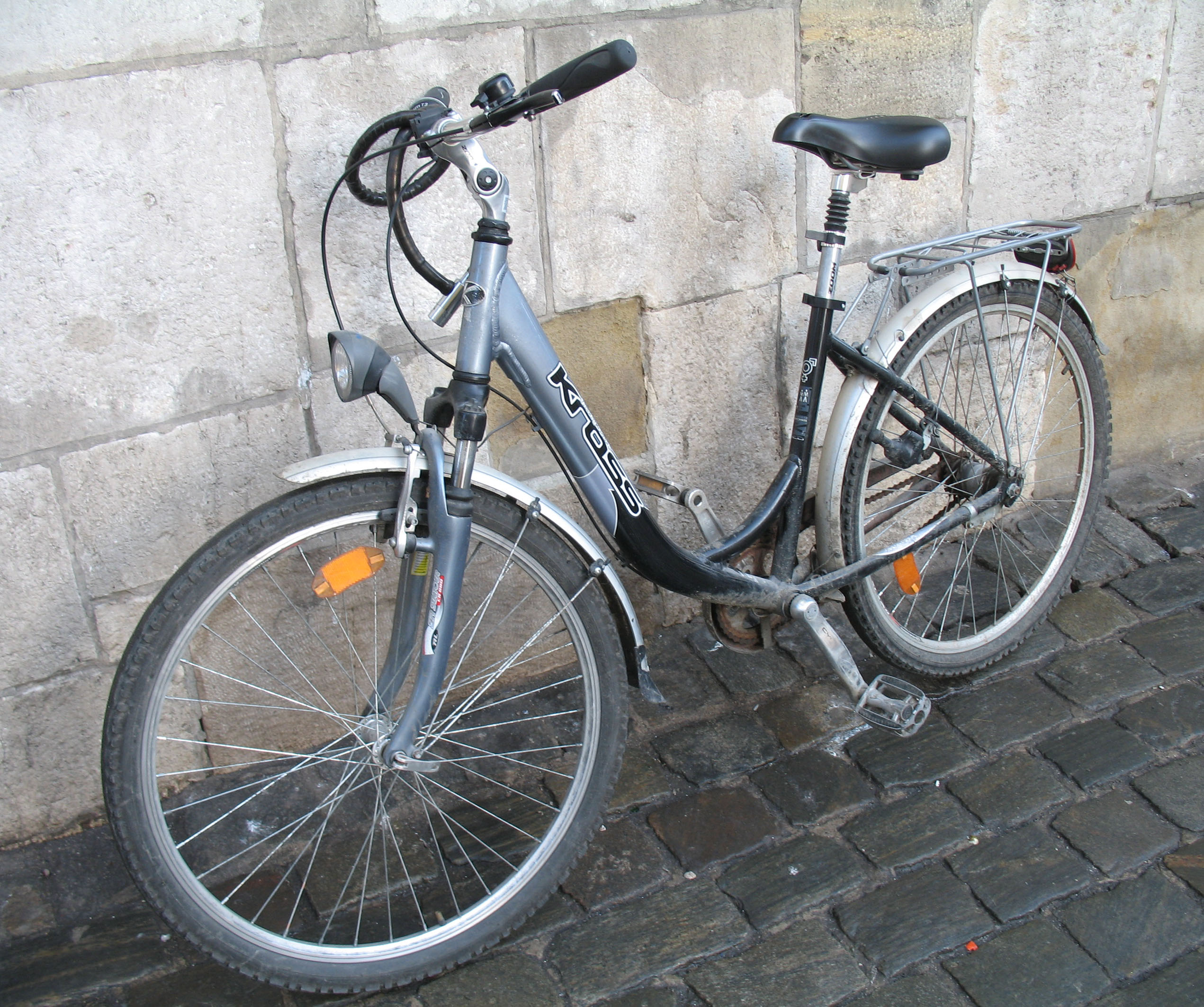
Kross Gorky Park

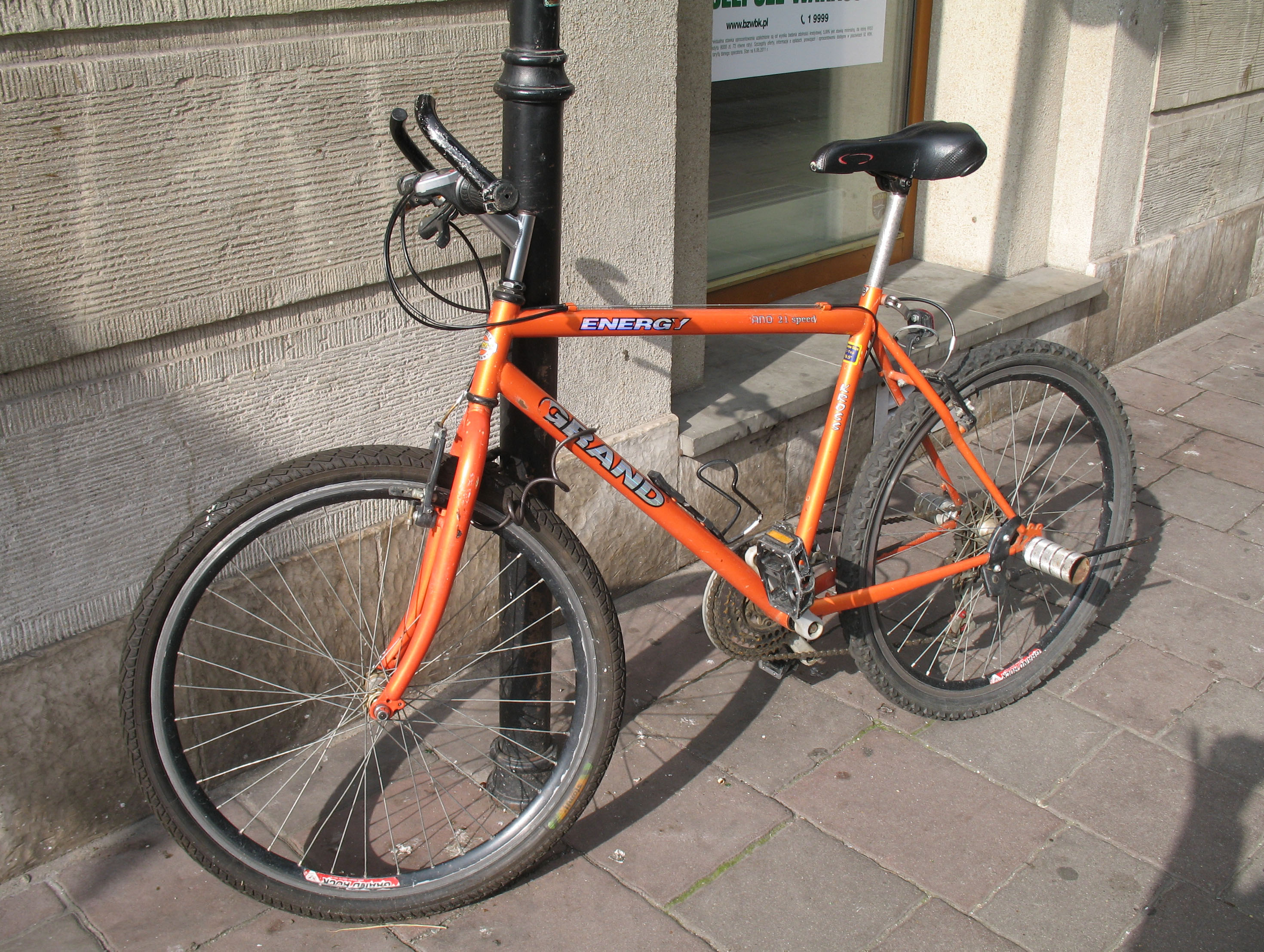
Kross Grand Energy

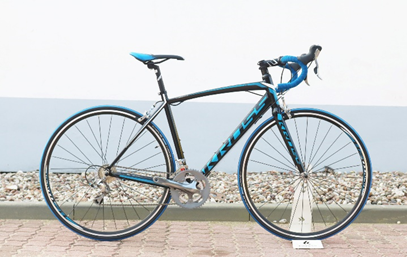
Kross Vento

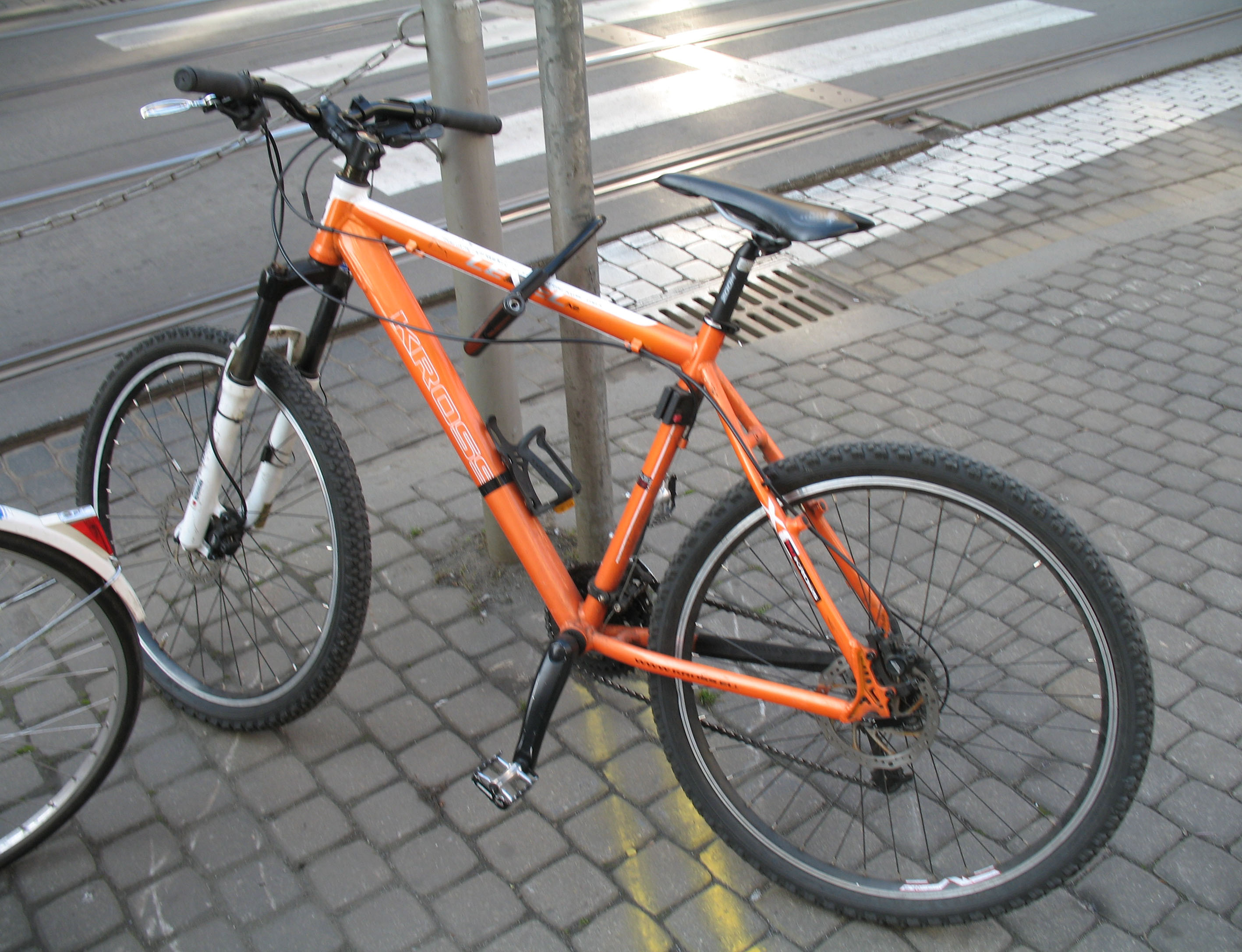
Kross Level A2

== See also ==
- Economy of Poland
- List of Polish companies
