= Grabik, Lower Silesian Voivodeship =

Grabik
- Village
- Location within Poland
- Coordinates: 51°38′06″N 15°55′07″E
- Country: Poland
- Voivodeship: Lower Silesian
- County: Polkowice
- Gmina: Gaworzyce

Grabik [ˈɡrabik] is a village in the administrative district of Gmina Gaworzyce, within Polkowice County, Lower Silesian Voivodeship, in south-western Poland.
