= Witanowice, Lower Silesian Voivodeship =

Witanowice
- Village
- Location within Poland
- Coordinates: 51°39′N 15°55′E
- Country: Poland
- Voivodeship: Lower Silesian
- County: Polkowice
- Gmina: Gaworzyce

Witanowice [vitanɔˈvit͡sɛ] (German: Weichnitz) is a village in the administrative district of Gmina Gaworzyce, within Polkowice County, Lower Silesian Voivodeship, in south-western Poland.
