= Głogów Głęboki-Przemysłowy mine =

Copper mine in Poland

- Location: Polkowice, Polkowice County, Poland
- Products: Copper
- Opened: 2004
- Company: KGHM Polska Miedź

The Głogów Głęboki-Przemysłowy mine (Deep Głogów) is a large mine in the west of Poland in Polkowice, Polkowice County, 350 km south-west of the capital, Warsaw. Głogów Głęboki-Przemysłowy represents one of the largest copper and silver reserves in Poland having estimated reserves of 292 million tonnes of ore grading 2.4% copper and 79 g/tonnes silver. The annual ore production is around 6 million tonnes from which 144,000 tonnes of copper and 474 tonnes of silver are extracted.
