= Hortex =

Polish food company

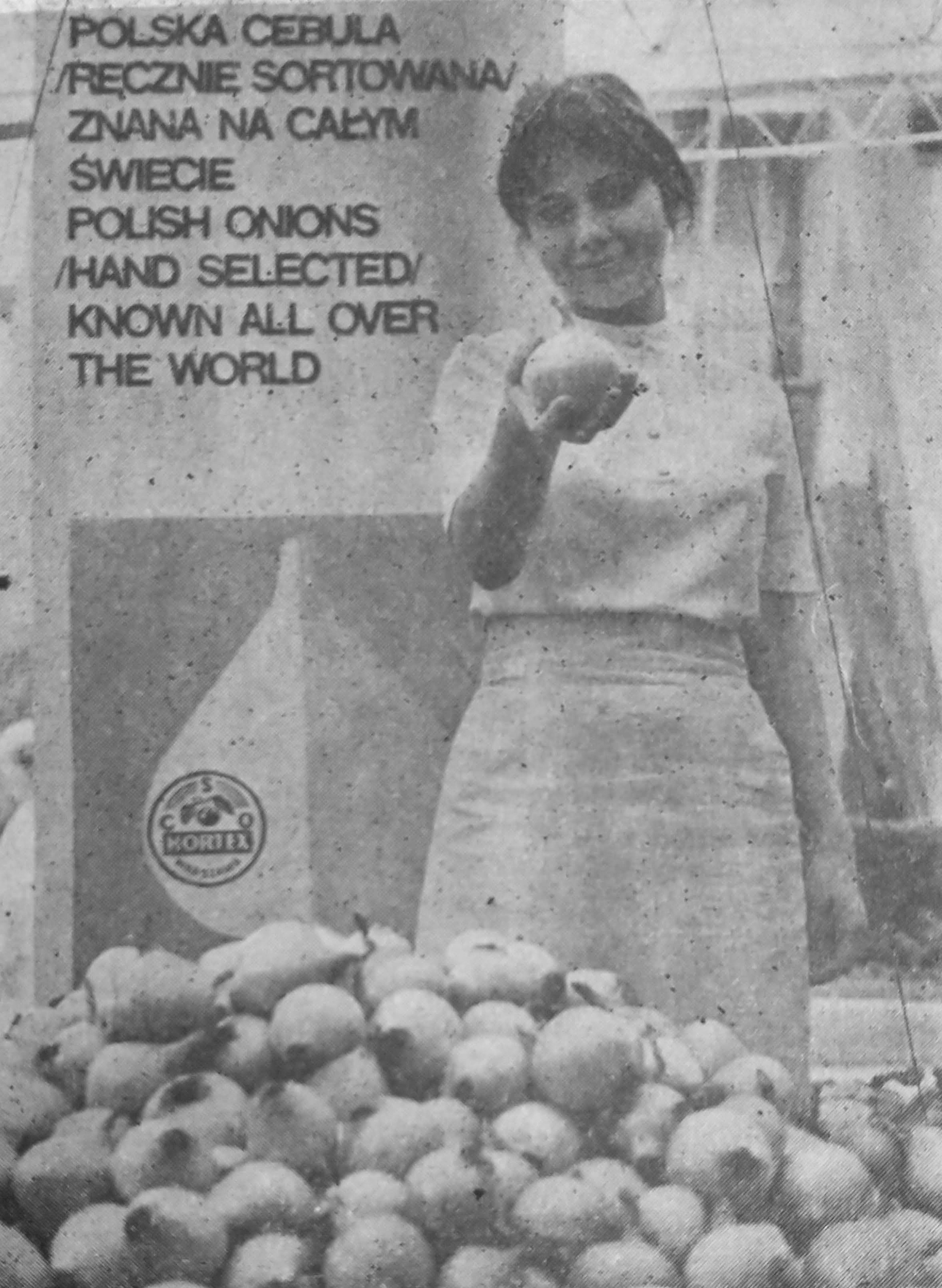

Hortex is a company in Poland that produces frozen foods and branded fruit juices.

There are over 1600 employees who work for Hortex in Poland. There are many seasonal employees who are hired during the time of processing fruits and vegetables. The processing plants are located in Przysucha, near Radom, Ryki and Skierniewice. There are 90,000 retail outlets throughout Poland that sell Hortex products.

== Overview ==
Company was established in 1958 as Przedsiębiorstwo Handlu Zagranicznego "Hortex" operating within the framework of Centrala Spółdzielnia Ogrodniczych (CSO). In the 1970s, it was one of the main suppliers of agri-food products in Poland, and in the 1980s, a producer of apple juice concentrate.

In 1989, the assets of the company were taken over by Hortex Sp. z o.o., which was to be privatized in 1994 as part of the stock and employee privatization, but remained in the hands of the State Treasury. Bad management in this period resulted in significant debt so in 1997 restructuring was carried out, during which there were irregularities identified by the Supreme Audit Office. In 1997, the company changed its name to Hortex Holding Spółka Akcyjna.

In 1999, the main shareholders of the company were BGZ Bank, Bank Handlowy, EBRD and Bank of America. As part of the restructuring process, 7 out of 10 factories were sold, including one to an employee-owned company. In 2003, Bank of America bought shares from other shareholders and in 2006, the European private equity fund Argan Capital terminated its cooperation with Bank of America and bought from it shares of some companies that it had so far managed on behalf of the bank, including Hortex Holding. In 2012, in place of the existing enterprise, three companies were created: the juice producer Hortex Holding SA, the freezer producer Ortika Polska Sp. z o.o. and Hortex Marketing Services Sp. z o.o., which provides marketing services for the other two companies. In 2013, the Argan Capital fund offered Hortex shares for an estimated amount of EUR 300 million, but, due to the lack of investors, it did not take place. In June 2017, the company was put up for sale again. The buyer was the private equity fund Mid-Europa Partners, and the estimated value of the transaction was EUR 200 million. The transaction was closed on January 23 of the following year.

The Hortex brand name comes from two words: hortus — garden and export.

The Hortex group also includes the company Polski Ogród Sp. z o.o.
