= Dzików, Lower Silesian Voivodeship =

Dzików
- Village
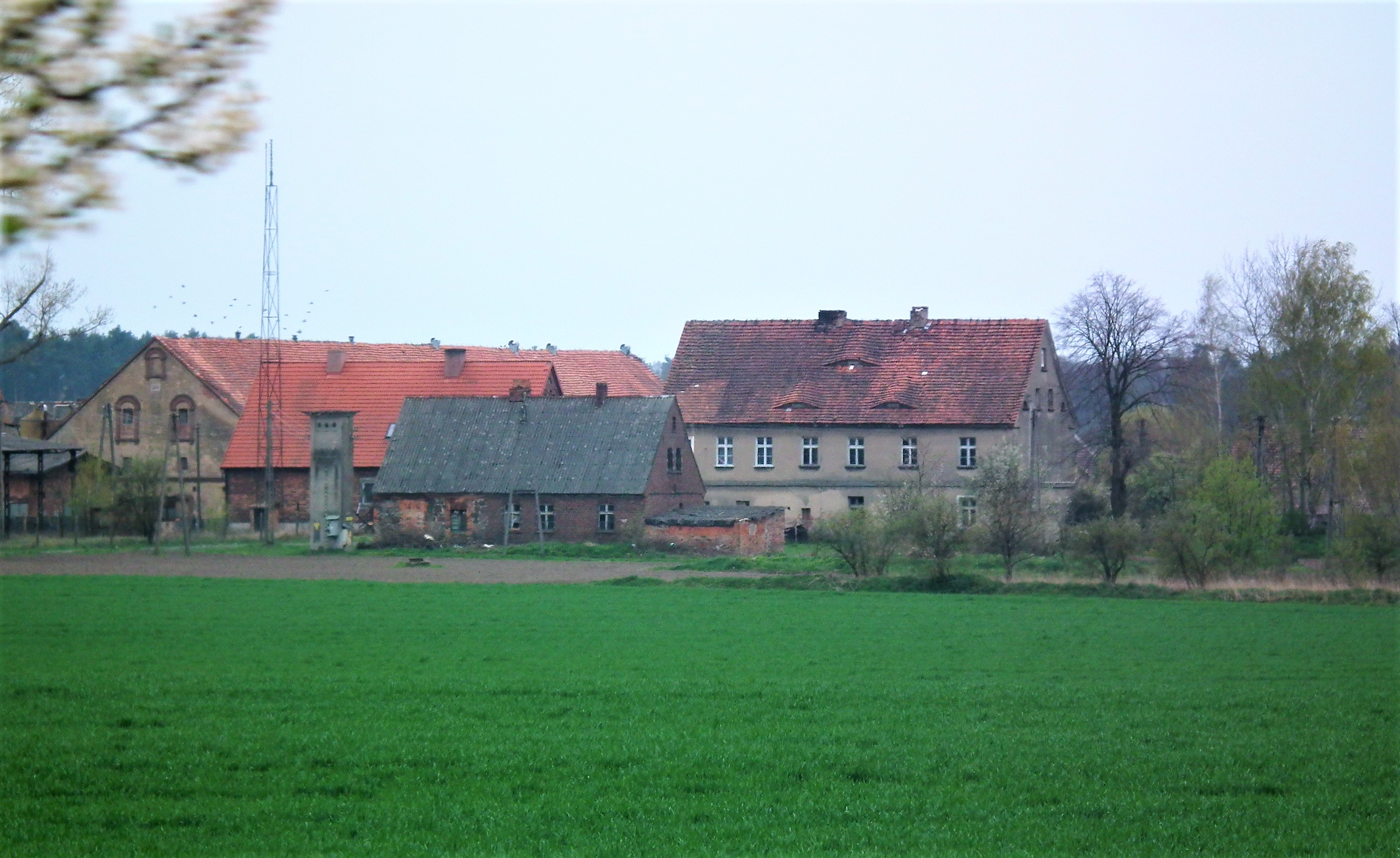

- Location within Poland
- Coordinates: 51°37′01″N 15°51′16″E
- Country: Poland
- Voivodeship: Lower Silesian
- County: Polkowice
- Gmina: Gaworzyce

Dzików [ˈd͡ʑikuf] is a village in the administrative district of Gmina Gaworzyce, within Polkowice County, Lower Silesian Voivodeship, in south-western Poland.
