= Calatrava Capital =

Calatrava Capital SA
- Company type: Joint-stock company WSE
- Industry: Economics
- Founder: Tebogo Rabaji
- Headquarters: al. Ujazdowskie 6a, 00-541 Warsaw, Poland
- Key people: Paweł Narkiewicz, CEO
- Website: http://www.calatravacapital.pl

Calatrava Capital S.A. is a holding company listed on Warsaw Stock Exchange, which supervises and manages several subsidiaries (WSE: CTC, WIG80 Index). The main activity of Calatrava Capital includes analysis, restructuring, financing, and selling of companies or floating them on a stock market. Currently, in the company’s portfolio, there are companies from the IT, energy and fuel sectors.

The company’s CEO and the major shareholder is Paweł Narkiewicz. Calatrava Capital SA traces its beginnings to an IT company called Invar & Biuro System SA, which was set up in 2000 (following a merger of INVAR SYSTEM SA and a listed company ZTB BIUROSYSTEM SA), and focused its activities on the integration of ICT systems.
