= Clicktrans =

- Founded: 2010
- Founder: Michał Brzeziński, Agnieszka Korzeniewska
- Website: https://clicktrans.com/

Clicktrans is an online marketplace that connects individuals and businesses with transport providers driving a similar route. It was founded in 2010 in Gdańsk, Poland.

== Overview ==
Clicktrans connects individual and business customers with transport providers who are already making the same route. This means that a transport provider avoids unnecessary greenhouse gas emissions and customers save on transport. The customer lists his items on the platform for free. Transport providers willing to take on the job offer a quote and the customer chooses the one that suits him best. Clicktrans operates through a success fee – the transport providers are only charged for the jobs they get. In 2024, the company has more than 38,000 verified transport providers from all over Europe.

== History ==
Clicktrans was founded in 2010 by Michal Brzezinski and Agnieszka Korzeniewska, based in Gdansk, Poland. It was the first Polish online marketplace connecting both private and business customers with transport providers. In 2015, Clicktrans entered the English market and in 2016 the platform was available for Spanish users. In 2017, the platform also covered the German market, and in 2021 — Italian.

A mobile app for transport providers was launched in 2020. Every year, Clicktrans publishes reports showing transport data for various shipment types (mainly removals, cars and motorcycles). The reports are published on Clicktrans' website and in media.
