= List of railway companies in Poland =

The majority of railway companies in Poland, especially ones that operate passenger services, are state-owned, either by Polish State Railways (PKP) or the voivodeship the company is serving. Whilst for freight companies, the only state-owned company is PKP Cargo.

Until PKP's major restructuring in 2001, the dominant railway company of Poland was PKP itself, with an exception to smaller city-owned companies, such as the Warsaw Metro and Tricity Rapid Urban Railway.

== List ==
The following is a list of active railway companies in Poland:

Operator code	Name		Mode	Owner	Operations began
Operator code	English	Polish	Mode	Owner	Operations began
ARP	Arriva RP		Regional rail	(United Kingdom) Arriva	12 October 2007
CTLL	CTL Logistics		Freight	(United Kingdom) Compass Partners	1992
DBSRP	DB Cargo Poland	DB Cargo Polska	Freight	(Germany) Deutsche Bahn	2001
KD	Lower Silesian Railways	Koleje Dolnośląskie	Regional rail	Lower Silesian Voivodeship	14 December 2008
KMAL	Lesser Poland Railways	Koleje Małopolskie	Regional rail	Lesser Poland Voivodeship	2 December 2013
KMKOL	Masovian Railways	Koleje Mazowieckie	Regional rail	Masovian Voivodeship	1 January 2005
KSL	Silesian Railways	Koleje Śląskie	Regional rail	Silesian Voivodeship	1 October 2011
PLKW	Greater Poland Railways	Koleje Wielkopolskie	Regional rail	Greater Poland Voivodeship	13 December 2010
LOTOS	Orlen Rail (Note: Formerly Lotos Kolej lit. 'Lotos Rail'.)	Orlen Kolej	Freight	(Poland) Orlen	8 October 2003
LKA	Łódź Agglomeration Railway	Łódzka Kolej Aglomeracyjna	Commuter rail	Łódź Voivodeship	15 June 2014
MW	Warsaw Metro	Metro Warszawskie	Rapid transit	Warsaw	7 April 1995
PKPC	PKP Cargo		Freight	(Poland) Polish State Railways	8 September 2000
PKPIC	PKP Intercity		Intercity rail, high-speed rail	(Poland) Polish State Railways	1 September 2001
PREG	Polregio		Regional rail	(Poland) Polish State Railways	1 October 2001
SKMWA	Rapid Urban Railway	Szyba Kolej Miejska	Commuter rail	Warsaw (Note: On behalf of Rapid Urban Railway.)	3 October 2005
SKMT	Tricity Rapid Urban Railway	Szyba Kolej Miejska w Trójmieście	Commuter rail	(Poland) Polish State Railways, Gdańsk, Gdynia, Pomeranian Voivodeship, and others	2 January 1951
SKPL	Shortlines	Stowarzyszenie Kolejowych Przewozów Lokalnych	Regional rail, freight	Privately held	18 March 2001
WKD	Warsaw Commuter Railway	Warszawska Kolej Dojazdowa	Commuter rail	Masovian Voivodeship	11 December 1927
