= Gaworzyce =

- Village
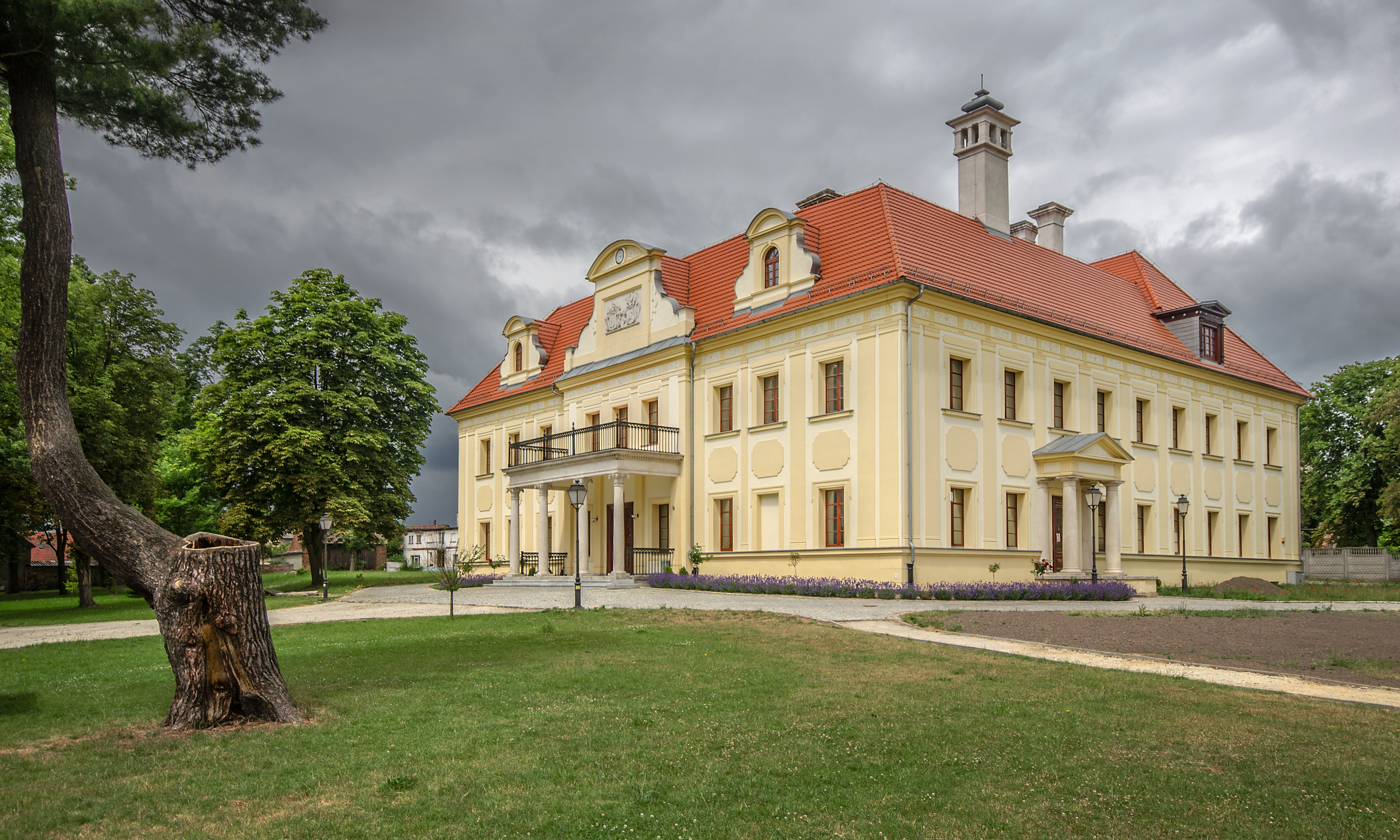
- Palace

- Location within Poland
- Coordinates: 51°37′41″N 15°52′50″E
- Country: Poland
- Voivodeship: Lower Silesian
- County: Polkowice
- Gmina: Gaworzyce
- Population: 1,500

Gaworzyce [ɡavɔˈʐɨt͡sɛ] (German: Quaritz) is a village in Polkowice County, Lower Silesian Voivodeship, in south-western Poland. It is the seat of the administrative district (gmina) called Gmina Gaworzyce.
