= Halemba =

- Ruda Śląska District
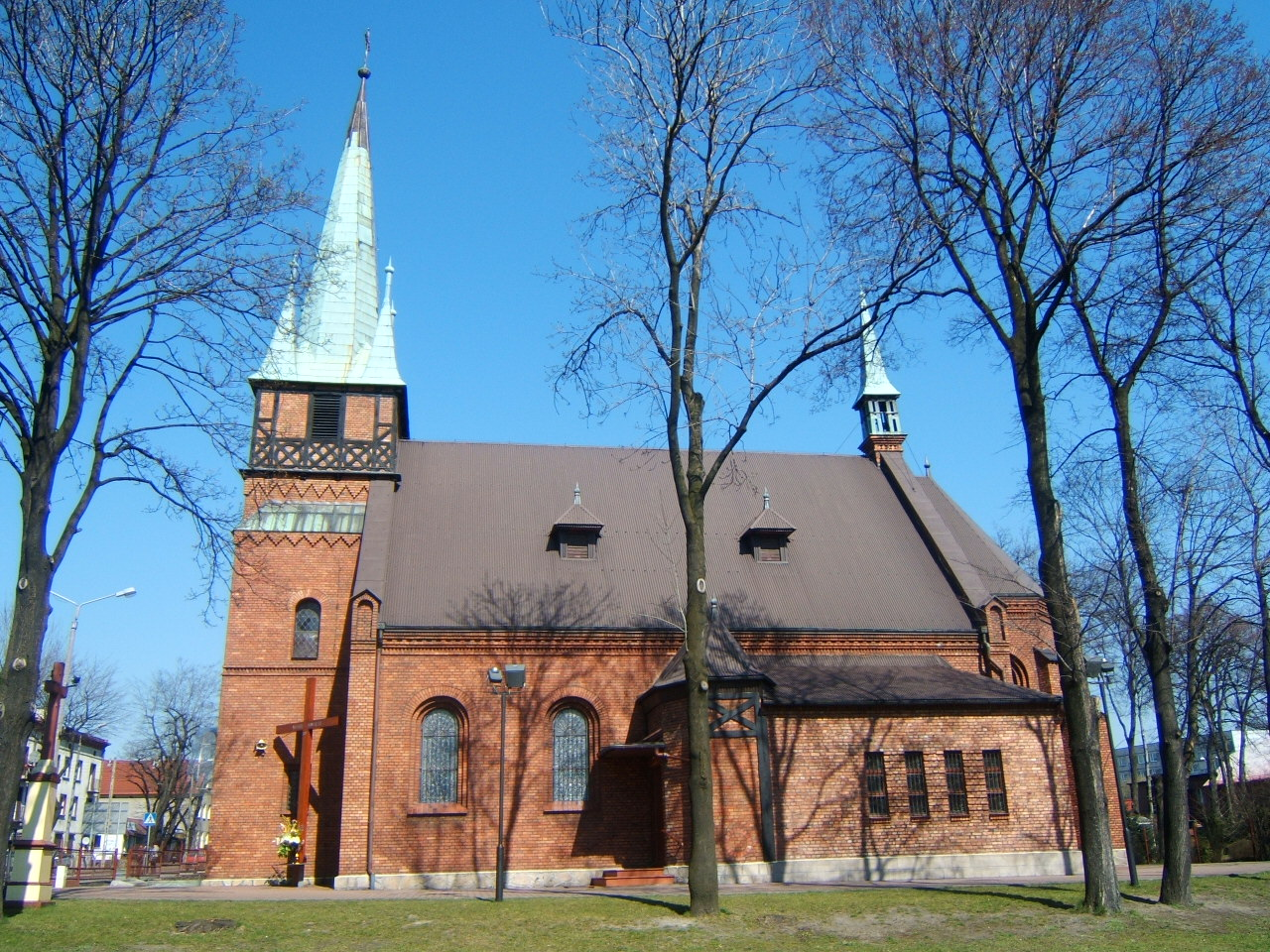
- Saint Mary church

- Location of Halemba within Ruda Śląska
- Coordinates: 50.237847°N 18.863280°E
- Country: Poland
- Voivodeship: Silesian
- County/City: Ruda Śląska

Area
  - Total: 19.6 km^{2} (7.6 sq mi)

Population (2006)
  - Total: 26,080
  - Density: 1,330/km^{2} (3,450/sq mi)
- Time zone: UTC+1 (CET)
  - Summer (DST): UTC+2 (CEST)
- Area code: (+48) 032

Halemba is a district in the south-west of Ruda Śląska, Silesian Voivodeship, southern Poland. It lies on the river Kłodnica, right tritubary of Odra. It has an area of 19.6 km^{2} and in 2006 it was inhabited by 26,080 people.

== History ==
The area encompasses three historically different settlements:

- Halemba (proper)
- Kłodnica (German: Klodnitz)
- Stara Kuźnica (German: Althammer)

The first settlements appeared in the 15th century, when the area north of the river Kłodnica belonged to Kochłowice. A smithery was established here, and the settlement, which grew around it, was named Halemba after one the smiths. It was first mentioned in 1451.

Another settlement, Stara Kuźnica, commenced somewhat after 1394, when the forests laying south of Kłodnica were bestowed upon a smith Henryk, who was to establish another smithery. During the political upheaval caused by Matthias Corvinus the land around Pszczyna was overtaken by Casimir II, Duke of Cieszyn, who sold it in 1517 to the Hungarian magnates of the Thurzó family, forming the Pless state country. In the accompanying sales document issued on 21 February 1517 the village was mentioned as Kuznicze Nykowa.

The third settlement, Kłodnica, named after the river, developed alongside Stara Kuźnica, although across the river, which also constituted a border between different duchies and later state countries.

After World War I in the Upper Silesia plebiscite 458 out of 521 voters in Stara Kuźnica voted in favour of joining Poland, against 63 opting for staying in Germany. In Halemba it was 759 (out of 916) against 155 (additionally 70 out of 92 against 21 in manor goods) and in Kłodnica 228 (out of 251) against 22. All the three settlements became a part of Silesian Voivodeship, Second Polish Republic. They were then annexed by Nazi Germany at the beginning of World War II. In 1942 both the local coal mine and power station commenced to be built. After the war it was restored to Poland.

Kuźnica, Stara Kuźnica and Kłodnica were joined and merged into Nowy Bytom in 1951, and as part of Nowy Bytom was amalgamated with Ruda to form Ruda Śląska on December 31, 1958.

== Gallery ==
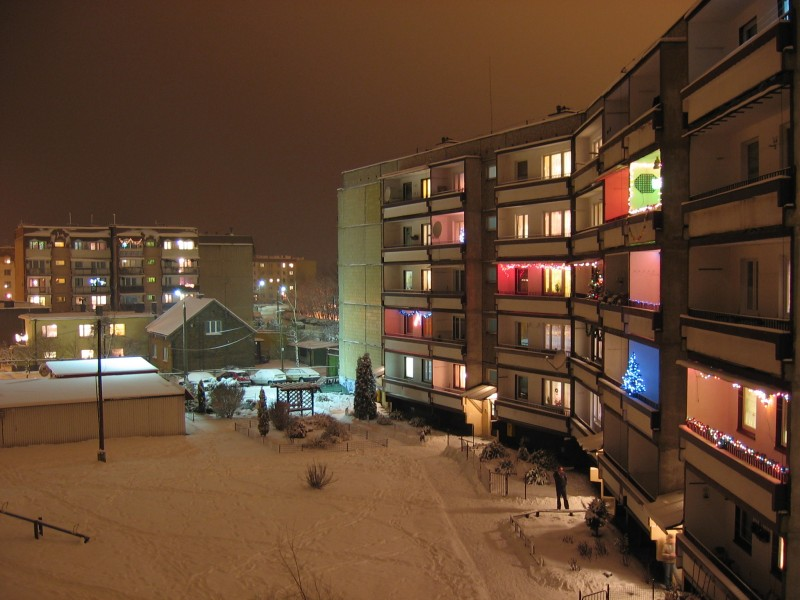
Housing estates in Halemba

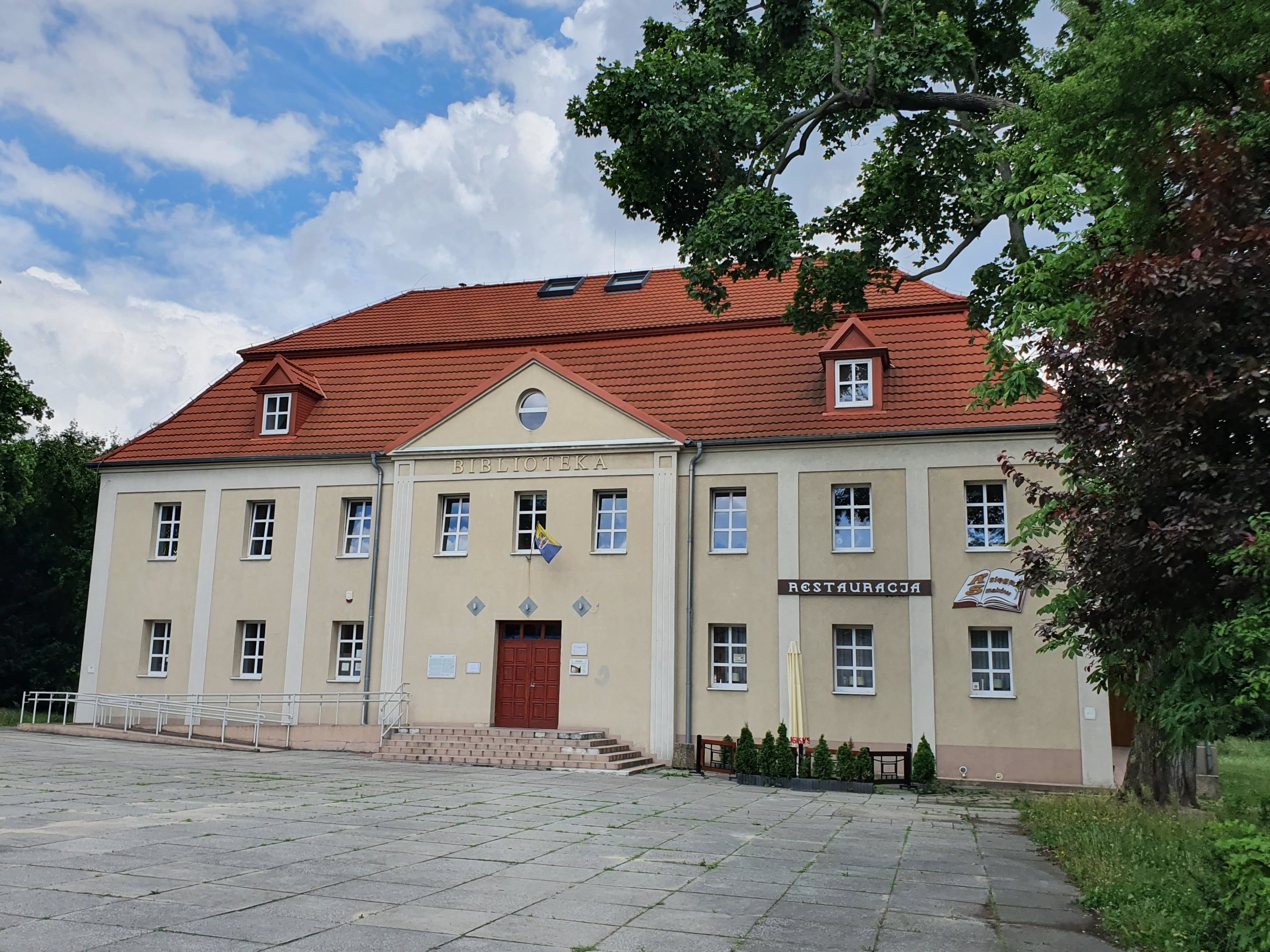
Donnersmarck palace

== See also ==
- Halemba Coal Mine
- Halemba Power Station
