= Robur (company) =

Związek Kopalń Górnośląskich Robur (English: Association of Upper Silesian Coal Mines Robur), was a wholesale coal merchant, which cooperated with a number of mines located in Second Polish Republic's Silesian Voivodeship. Its main office was located in Katowice.

Robur was founded in 1921 by a company named Emanuel Friedländer Co. Since 1928, it was turned into a limited partnership, which belonged to three companies: Alfred Falter, M. A. Goldschmidt-Rotschild and F. Oppenheimer. Robur cooperated with several Upper Silesian coal mines and coal associations, such as:

- Rybnik Coal Mining Consortium,
- Charlotte Coal Mining Consortium from Rybnik,
- mines and steelworks of the Donnersmarck family,
- East Upper Silesian Works of Count Nicolas von Ballestrem (since 1931: Ruda Śląska Coal Mining Consortium),
- Godulla S.A. from Chebzie,
- Waterloo Coal Mining Consortium from Zaleze,
- Pokoj Steel Mill from Nowy Bytom,
- Wirek S.A. from Wirek.

Robur was the wholesale coal merchant of interbellum Poland. Its managers were very active in international markets. After the German–Polish customs war, the company found new markets in Scandinavia. In 1927, Robur signed and agreement with Polish Ministry of Industry and Commerce, in which it rented for 35 years a wharf in a Baltic Sea port of Gdynia. At the same time, Robur pledged to export 125,000 tons of coal monthly, to fund four cranes for the port, and to purchase six bulk carriers.

In 1932, Robur's share in Polish coal sales reached 26%, and in export sales – 30%. The company had two general managers, Stanislaw Wachowiak and Jerzy Kramsztyk. Robur ceased to exist in September 1939 (see Invasion of Poland).

== Polskarob ==
In 1927 Robur opened its own sea transport company Polskarob (Polsko-Skandynawskie Towarzystwo Transportowe S.A., Polish – Scandinavian Transport Society, Joint-stock company), which owned seven bulk carriers. The company had its main office in Gdynia, and existed until 1972. Polskarob, as its name suggests, handled coal sales from Poland to Scandinavia. Until 1928, this trade was carried out by Association Vistula – Baltic, but this company was closed down, due to financial problems.

To support development of national economy, the government of the Second Polish Republic offered tax exemptions for companies eager to invest in the port of Gdynia and Polish merchant fleet. On May 9, 1927, Robur signed an agreement with National Treasury of Poland, upon which it rented a wharf in Gdynia for 35 years. In return, the government exempted Robur from income tax for five years. The company promised that within two years, it would fund its own fleet. Polskarob was officially founded in November 1927. Its general manager was Alfred Falter, who in 1936 became owner of both Polskarob and Robur.

The company owned altogether eight bulk carriers. All were named Robur, with numbers added to their names. First carrier, Robur I, was built in 1879, and had belonged to a Swedish company. During World War II, all operational carriers (Robur III, Robur IV, Robur V, Robur VI and Robur VIII) were moved to Great Britain. The company changed its name to A. Falter Shipowner, while its ships were named after Henryk Sienkiewicz's Trilogy: Kmicic, Częstochowa, Kordecki, Zbaraz, Zagloba. Three ships sank during the war; SS Zbaraz was bombed on July 15, 1940, SS Częstochowa was torpedoed on August 20, 1941, while SS Zagloba was lost in a transatlantic convoy, in February 1943.

== Sources ==
- Franciszek Biały, Związek Kopalń Górnośląskich Robur w: Encyklopedia historii gospodarczej Polski do 1945, t. 2. Warszawa 1981, wyd. Wiedza Powszechna, ISBN 83-214-0185-6 s. 563.
- Stanisław Wachowiak, Czasy, które przeżyłem. Warszawa: Interim, 1991. ISBN 83-85083-21-9.
