= Bykowina =

- Ruda Śląska District
- Sacred Heart church

- Location of Bykowina within Ruda Śląska
- Coordinates: 50.270634°N 18.894274°E
- Country: Poland
- Voivodeship: Silesian
- County/City: Ruda Śląska

Area
  - Total: 1.6 km^{2} (0.62 sq mi)

Population (2006)
  - Total: 18,267
  - Density: 11,000/km^{2} (30,000/sq mi)
- Time zone: UTC+1 (CET)
  - Summer (DST): UTC+2 (CEST)
- Area code: (+48) 032

Bykowina (German: Friedrichsdorf) is a district in the south-east of Ruda Śląska, Silesian Voivodeship, southern Poland. It has an area of 1.6 km^{2} and in 2006 it was inhabited by 18,267 people.

== History ==
The settlement developed adjacent to a quarry operating here from at least the 16th century up to the early 20th century. The village was first mentioned in 1629 as belonging to von Donnersmarck family. Since its beginnings it was closely tied with Kochłowice, originally formed on a hill within its borders. The village was heavily affected by industrial development in the 19th century. In 1907 the name of the municipality was changed into Friedrichsdorf.

After World War I in the Upper Silesia plebiscite 841 out of 1,198 voters in Bykowina (Friedrichsdorf) voted in favour of joining Poland, against 353 opting for staying in Germany. Afterwards it became a part of Silesian Voivodeship, Second Polish Republic. It was then annexed by Nazi Germany at the beginning of World War II. After the war it was restored to Poland.

Bykowina constituted a gmina (municipality) that was merged into Nowy Bytom in 1951, and as part of Nowy Bytom was amalgamated with Ruda to form Ruda Śląska on December 31, 1958.

== Gallery ==
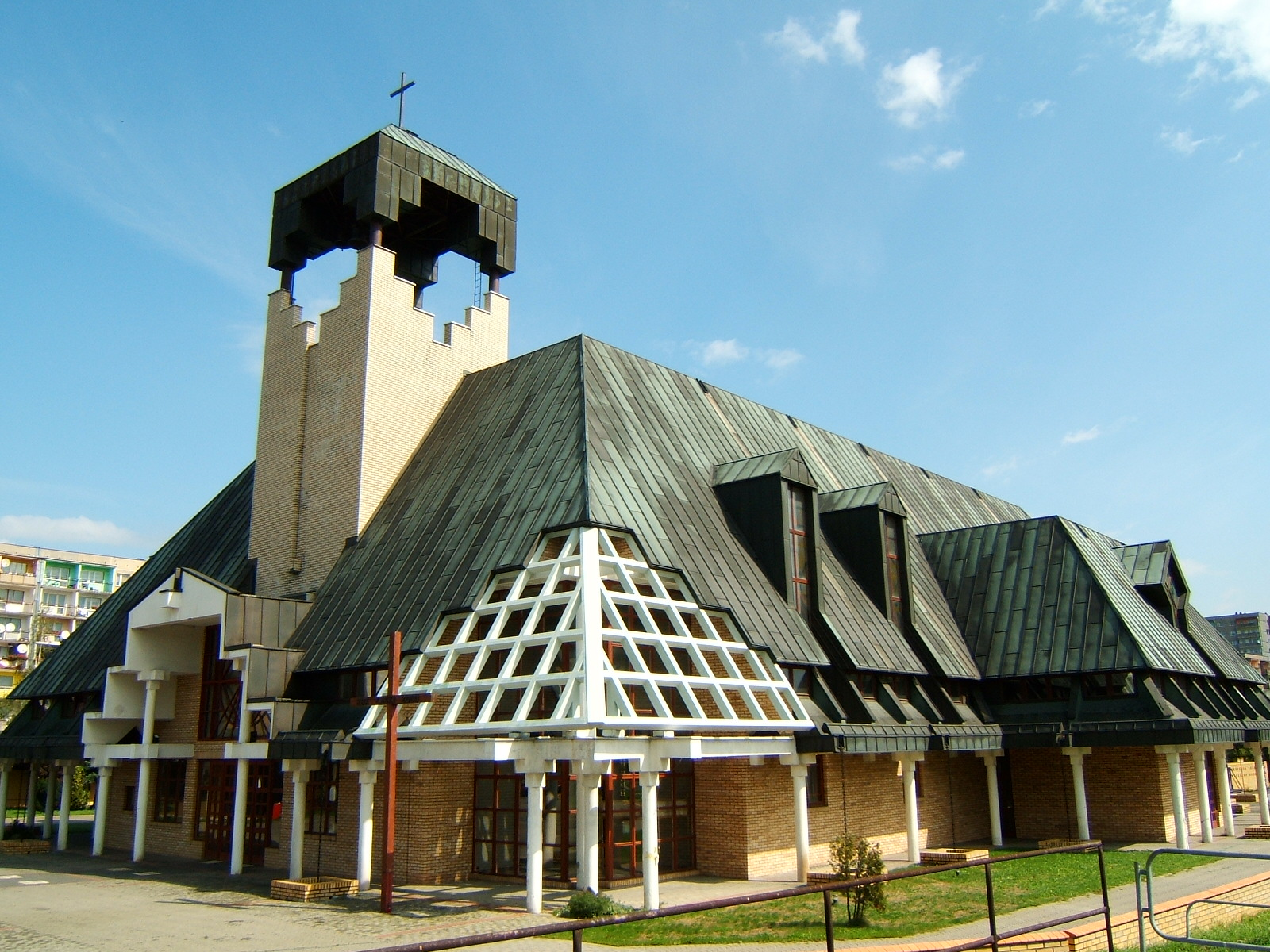
Saint Barbara church

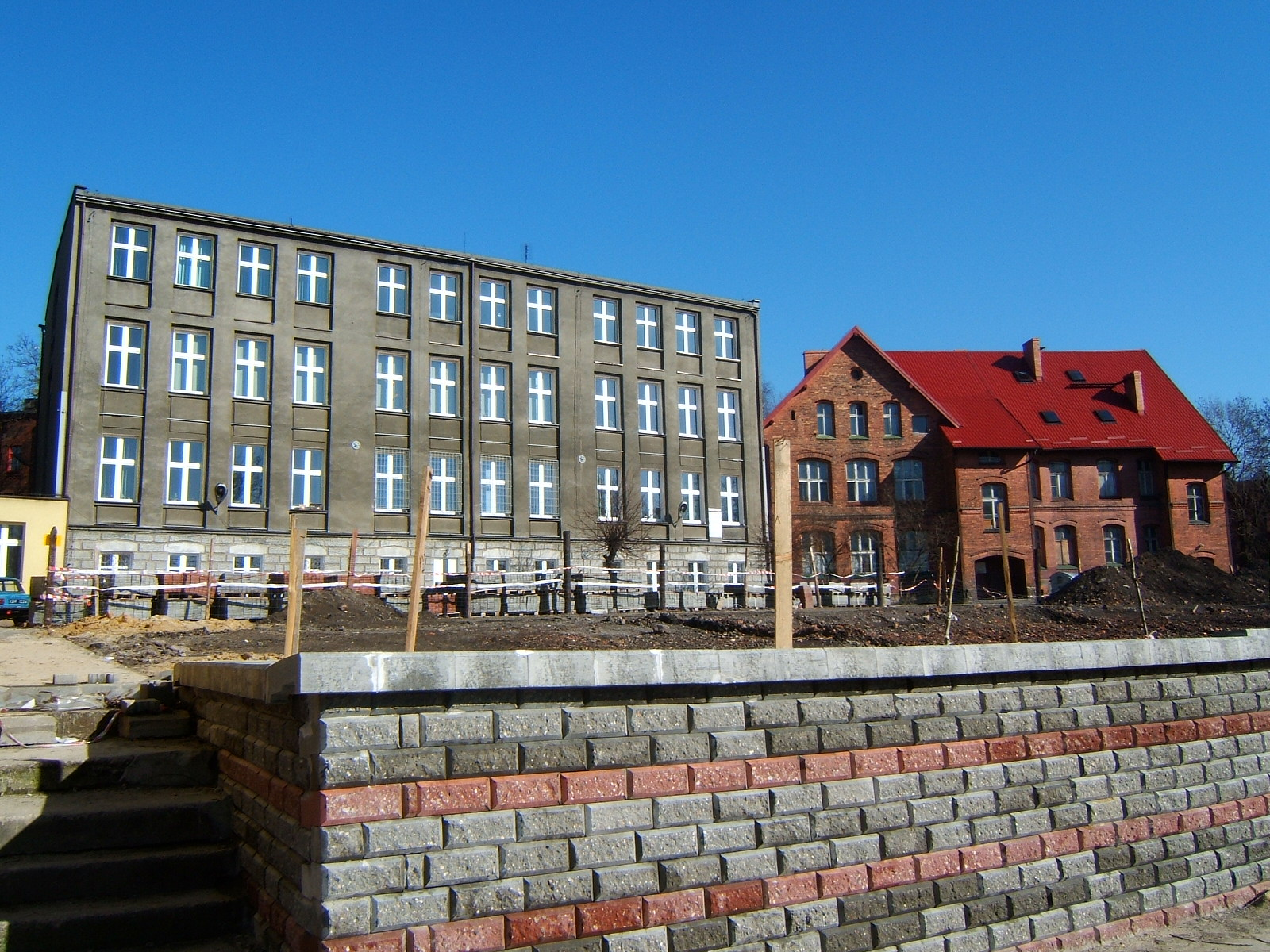
Schools

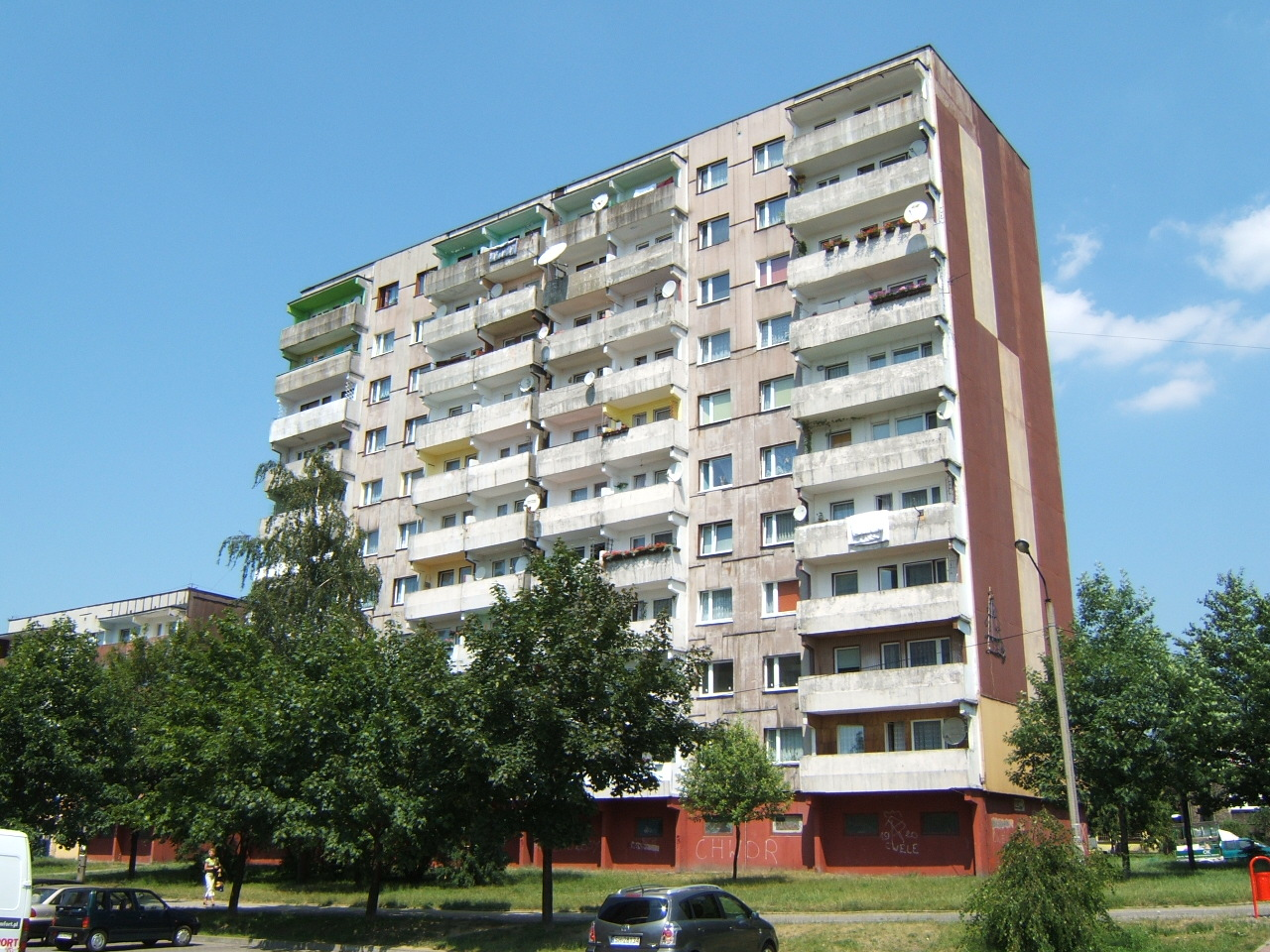
Nowa (New) Bykowina housing estate
