= Orzegów =

- Ruda Śląska District
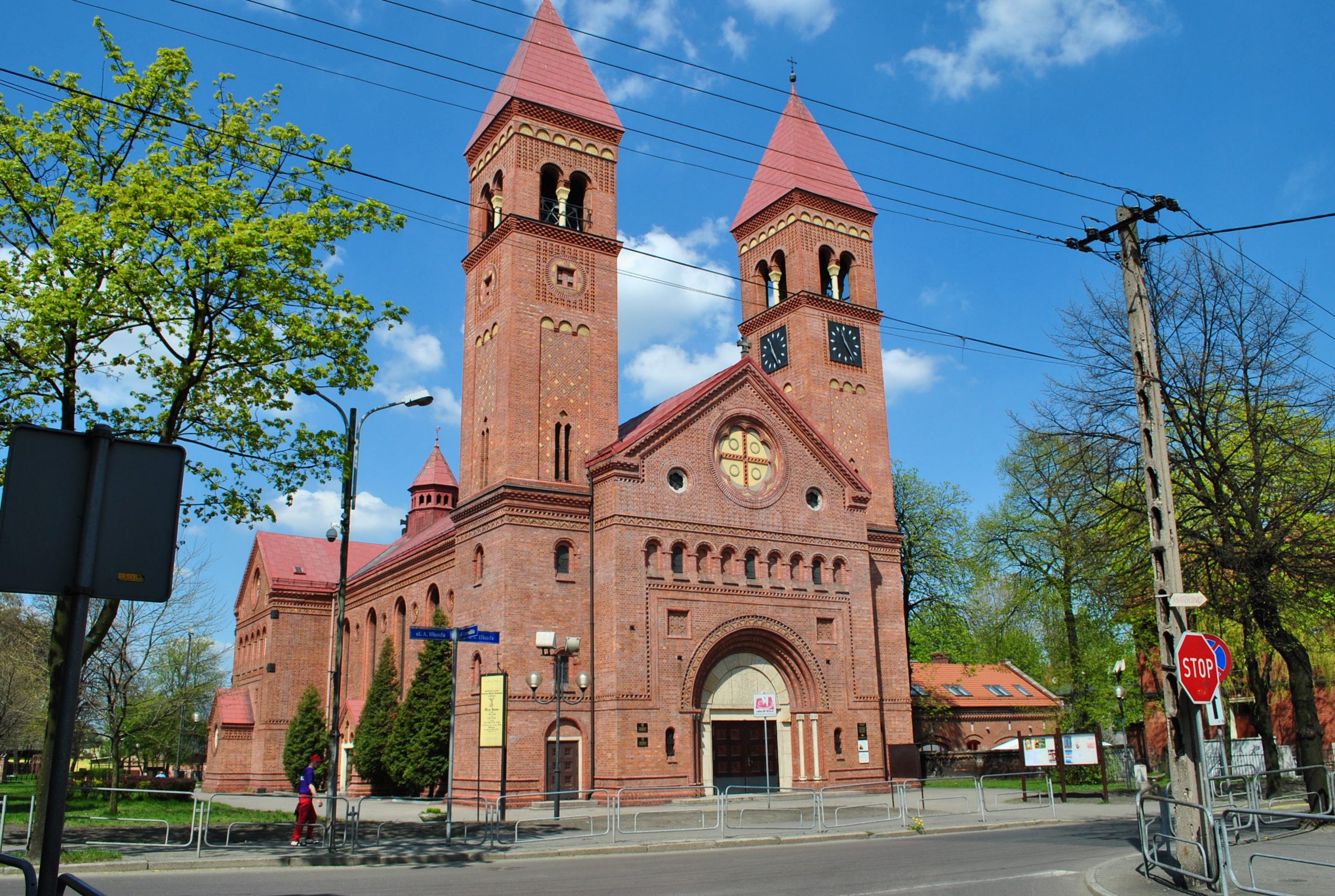
- St. Michael church

- Location of Orzegów within Ruda Śląska
- Coordinates: 50.324505°N 18.873503°E
- Country: Poland
- Voivodeship: Silesian
- County/City: Ruda Śląska

Area
  - Total: 2.5 km^{2} (0.97 sq mi)

Population (2006)
  - Total: 8,439
  - Density: 3,400/km^{2} (8,700/sq mi)
- Time zone: UTC+1 (CET)
  - Summer (DST): UTC+2 (CEST)
- Area code: (+48) 032

Orzegów (German: Orzegow) is a district in the north-east of Ruda Śląska, Silesian Voivodeship, southern Poland. It has an area of 2.5 km^{2} and in 2006 it was inhabited by 8,439 people.

== History ==
The settlement was first mentioned in 1305 as Osegow. The village belonged initially to the Duchy of Bytom, a fee of the Kingdom of Bohemia, which after 1526 became a part of the Habsburg monarchy. After Silesian Wars the area became a part of the Kingdom of Prussia. Before the industrial revolution in the 19th century the rural settlement of Orzegów lied along what is now Bytomska Street. Nowy Orzegów (New Orzegów) developed around the St. Michael church (built in years 1894-95) in the 20th century. The first coal mine, König David, was mentioned in 1768, it was visited by Johann Wolfgang von Goethe in 1790. In the 1826 the village was bought by Karl Godulla. In 1829 he opened a coal mine Orzegów. Karl Godula built a zinc melter south of Orzegów, where later a separate settlement developed, namely Godula.

After World War I in the Upper Silesia plebiscite 2,857 out of 4,211 voters in Orzegow voted in favour of joining Poland, against 1,345 opting for staying in Germany. Afterwards it became a part of Silesian Voivodeship, Second Polish Republic. It was then annexed by Nazi Germany at the beginning of World War II. After the war it was restored to Poland.

Orzegów constituted a gmina (municipality) that was merged into Ruda in 1951, and as part of Ruda was amalgamated with Nowy Bytom to form Ruda Śląska on December 31, 1958.
