= Robur =

Robur is Latin for "hard timber" or "oak", and, by metaphorical extension, "strength". It can refer to:

- Robur the Conqueror, an 1886 novel by Jules Verne, also known as The Clipper of the Clouds
  - Master of the World (novel), Verne's sequel novel, starring the same character
- Quercus robur, the pedunculate oak or English oak tree, a plant species
- Robur (truck), an East German truck brand
- Robur Carolinum (Latin for Charles' oak), a constellation named by the English astronomer Sir Edmond Halley in 1679
- Robur (company), a wholesale coal merchant

== See also ==
- Robor, the Gaulish god
