= Kochłowice, Ruda Śląska =

Kochłowice
- Ruda Śląska District
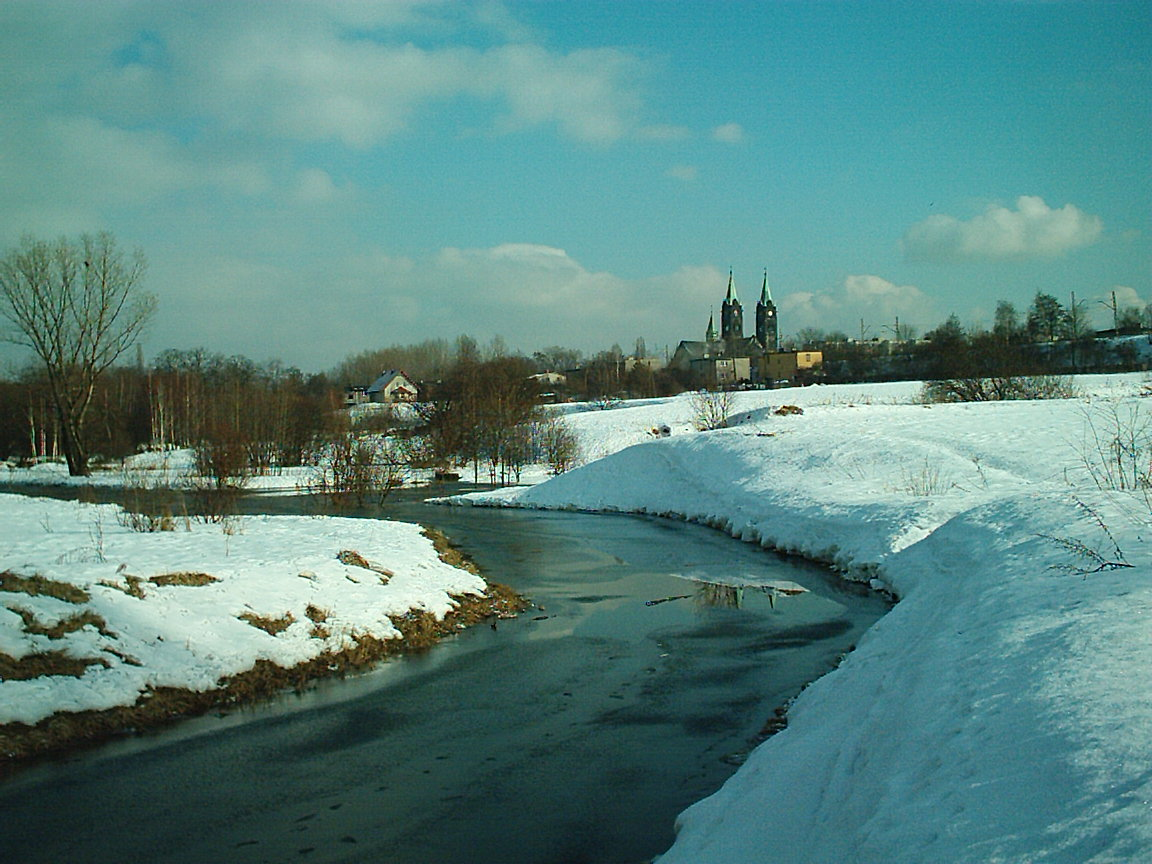
- Kochłowice, as seen from Kochłówka river banks

- Location of Kochłowice within Ruda Śląska
- Coordinates: 50.253787°N 18.901469°E
- Country: Poland
- Voivodeship: Silesian
- County/City: Ruda Śląska
- First mentioned: 1260
- Within city limits: 1959

Area
  - Total: 17.5 km^{2} (6.8 sq mi)

Population (2006)
  - Total: 12,738
  - Density: 728/km^{2} (1,890/sq mi)
- Time zone: UTC+1 (CET)
  - Summer (DST): UTC+2 (CEST)
- Area code: (+48) 032
- Vehicle registration: SL, SRS
- Primary airport: Katowice Airport

Kochłowice (German: Kochlowitz) is a district in the south-east of Ruda Śląska, Silesian Voivodeship, southern Poland. It has an area of 17.5 km^{2} and in 2006 it was inhabited by 12,738 people.

== History ==
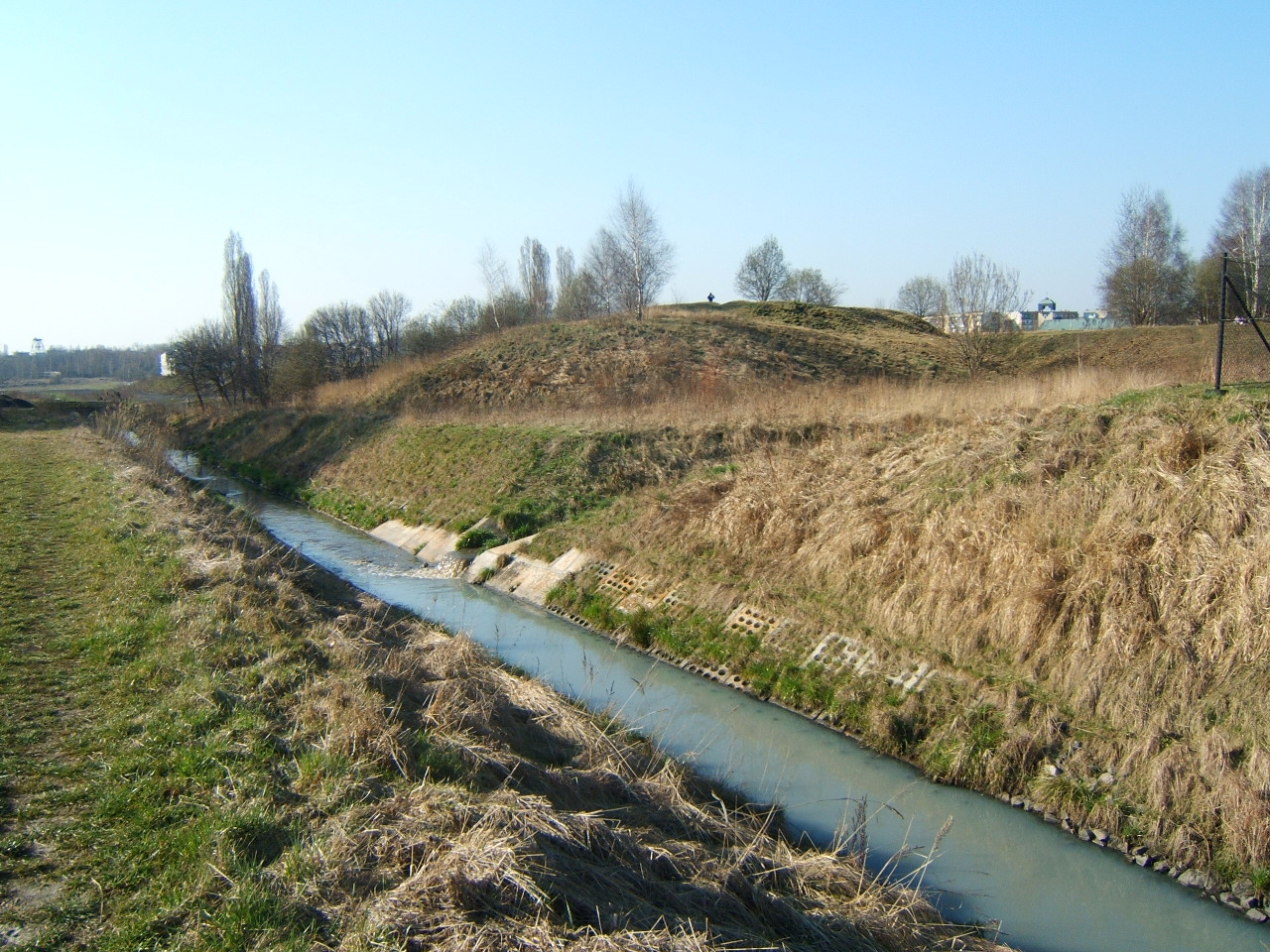
Grodzisko, a medieval archaeological site

Archaeological excavations in 2007 surfaced traces of a settlement on the territory of Kochłowice existed already in the 9th century. The area became part of the emerging Polish state in the 10th century, and was part of Piast-ruled Poland in the following centuries. The village was first mentioned in 1360 as Kochlowa Lanka. In the 16th and 17th centuries a salt mill (Salzhütte) operated here, the only such establishment in the Bytom state country. The village was annexed by Prussia in the 18th century, and from 1871 it was also part of Germany. The village was affected by industrial development in the 19th century (coal mines)

After World War I in the Upper Silesia plebiscite 3,364 out of 4,427 voters in Kochłowice voted in favour of rejoining Poland which had just regained independence, against 968 opting for staying in Germany. Afterwards it became a part of Silesian Voivodeship, Second Polish Republic. Following the joint German-Soviet invasion of Poland, which started World War II in September 1939, the village was occupied and annexed by Nazi Germany. The Germans established and operated a Polenlager forced labour camp for Poles in Kochłowice (see Nazi crimes against the Polish nation). After the war, the village was restored to Poland.

Kochłowice was merged into Nowy Bytom in 1951, and as part of Nowy Bytom was amalgamated with Ruda to form Ruda Śląska on December 31, 1958.

== Notable people ==
- Jan Wypler (1890–1965), Polish sinologist and translator
- Wilhelm Pluta (1910–1986), Polish Catholic bishop, Servant of God
- Henryk Bista (1934–1997), Polish actor
- Andrzej Urny (born 1957), Polish rock guitarist and music producer
- Wenanty Fuhl (born 1960), a retired Polish footballer

== Gallery ==
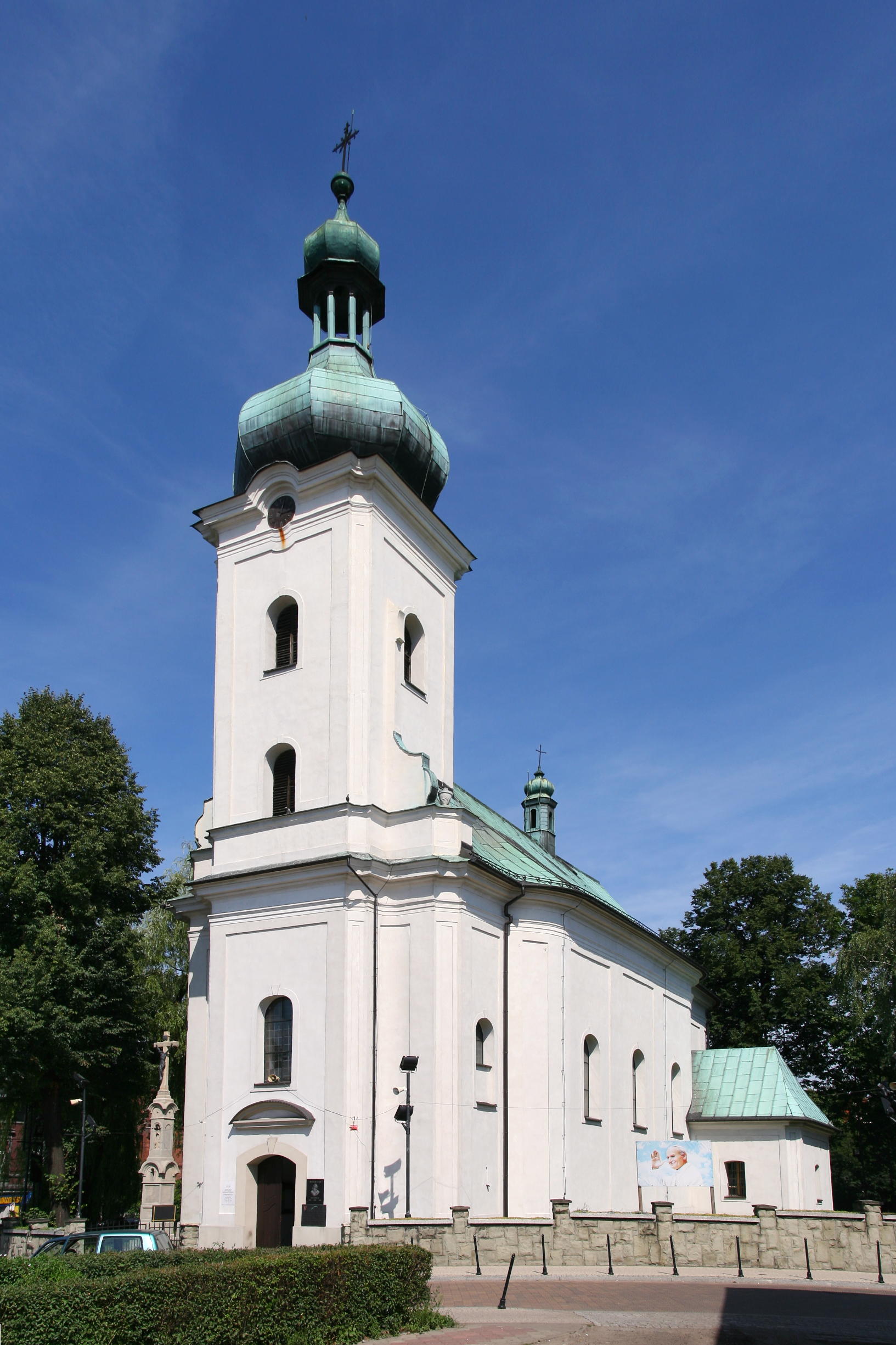
Our Lady of Lourdes church (sanctuary)

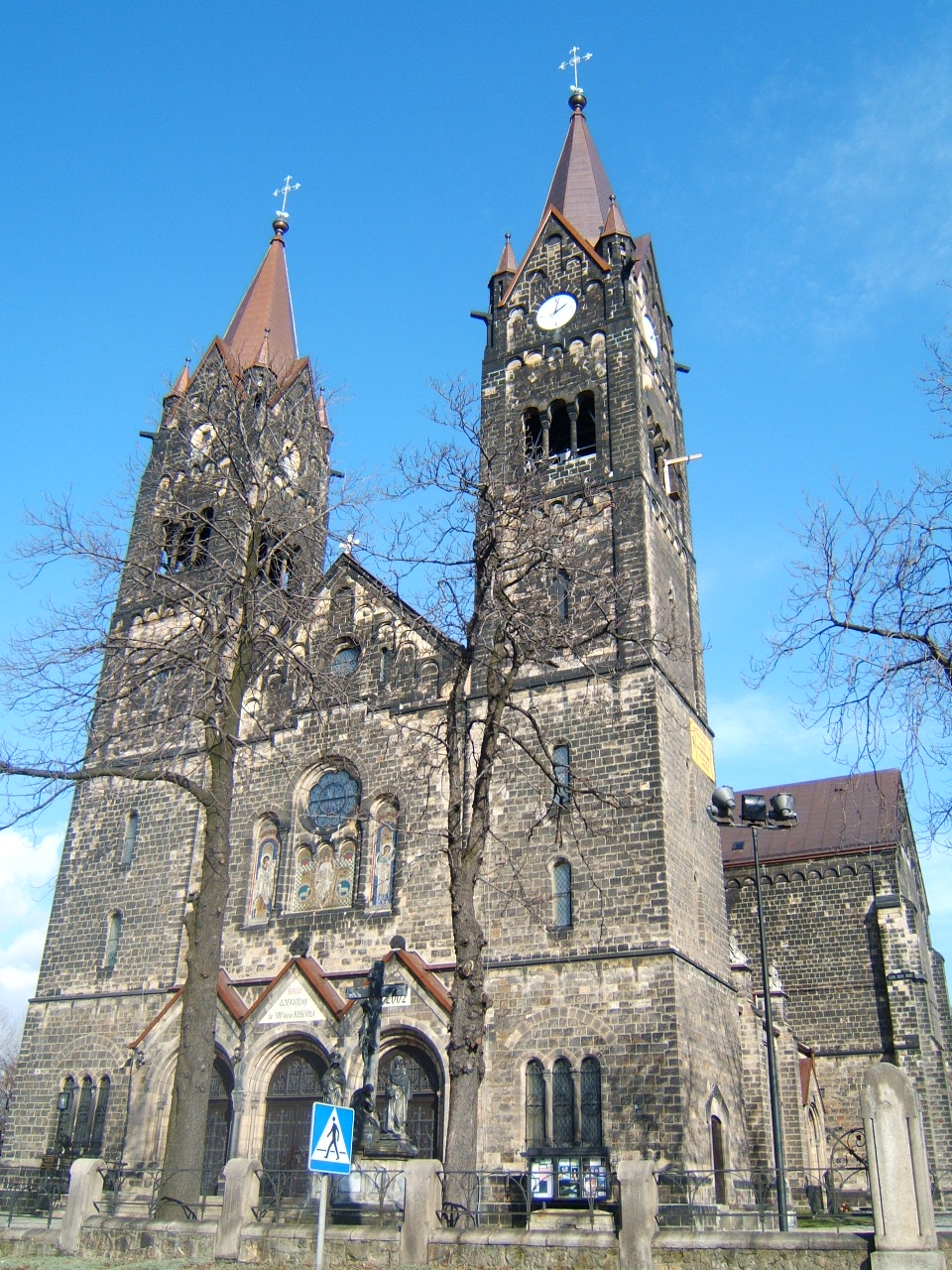
Holy Trinity church

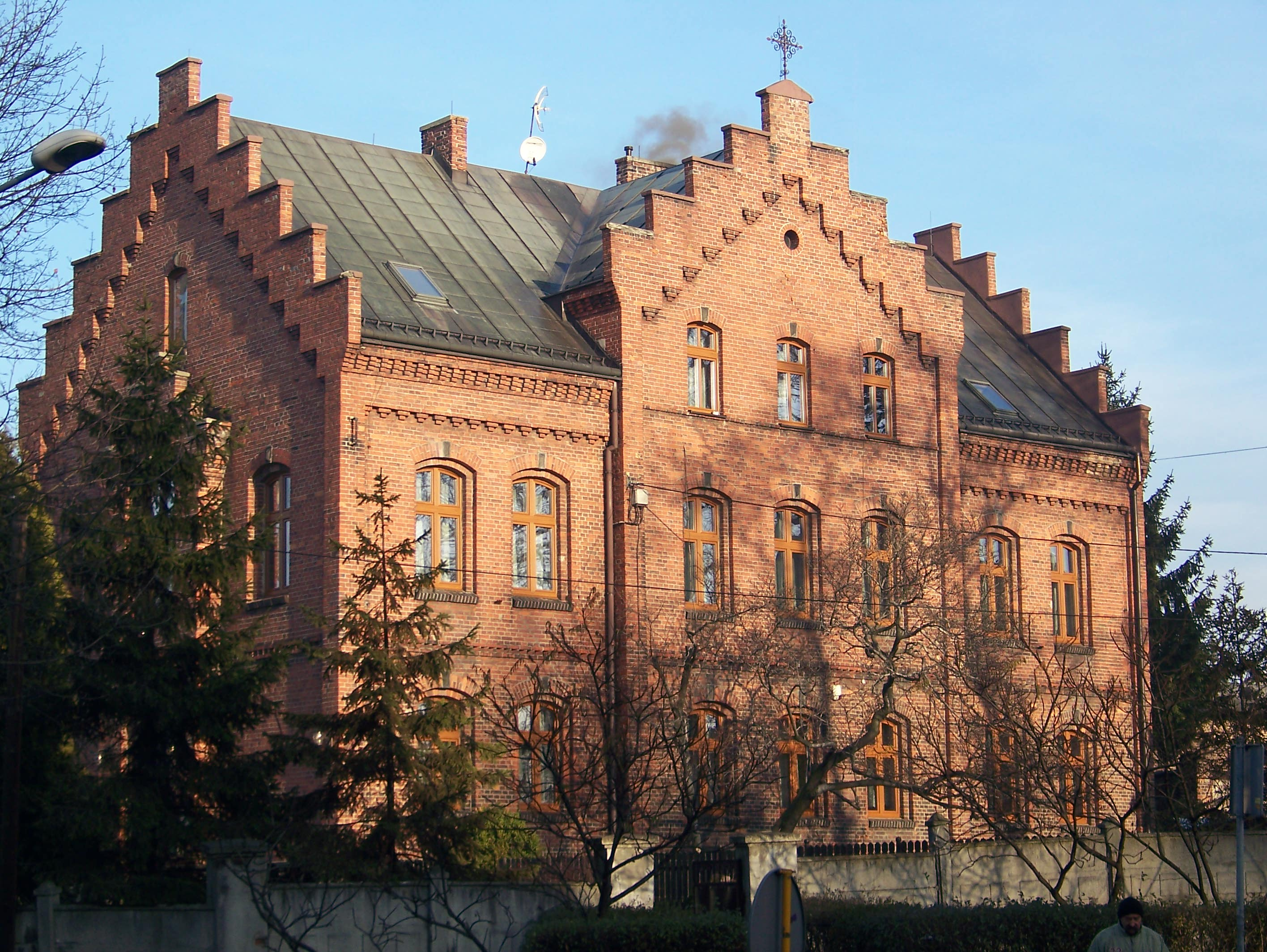
Parish house of the Holy Trinity church

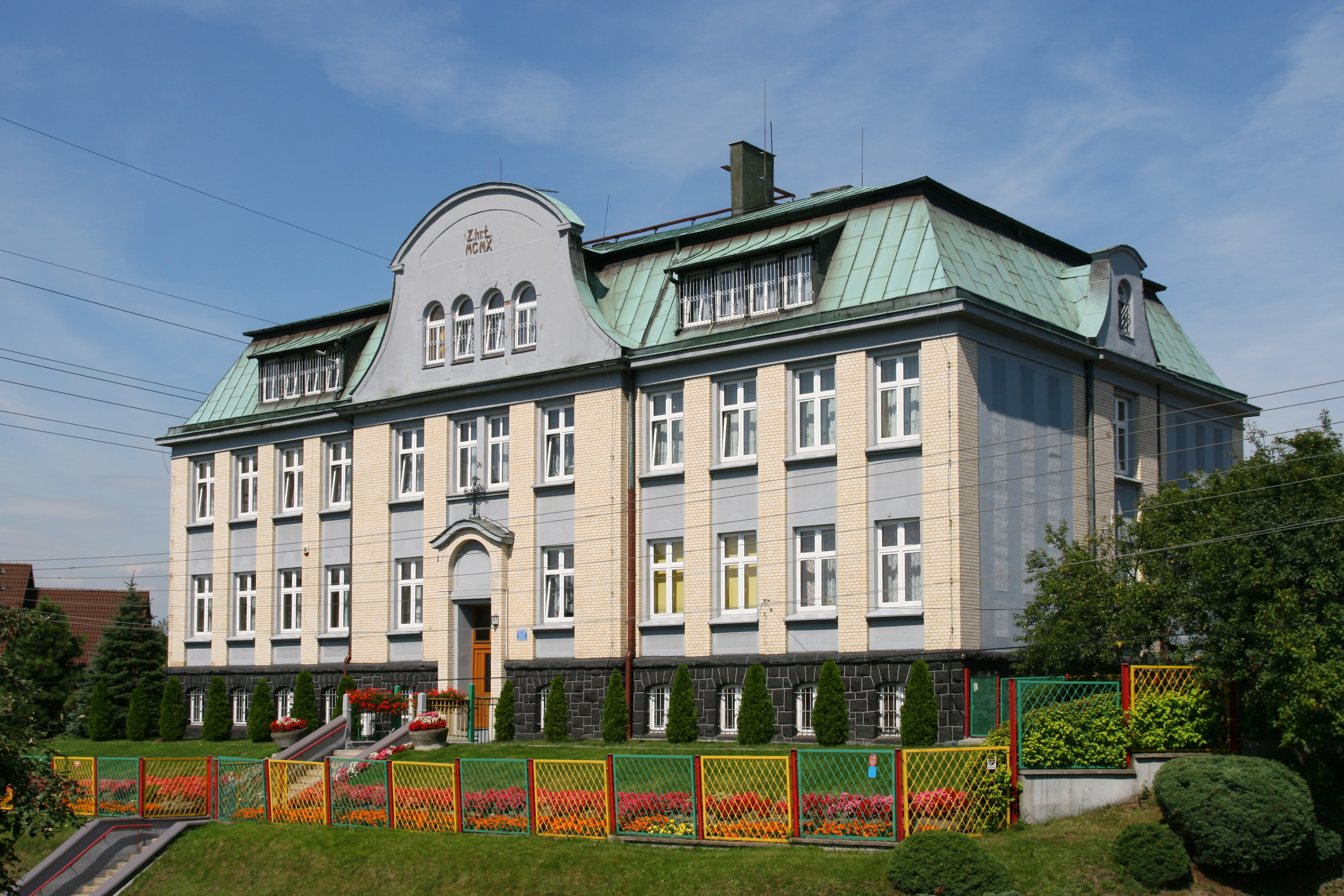
Nursing home for disabled people
