= Halemba Coal Mine =

Halemba coal mine
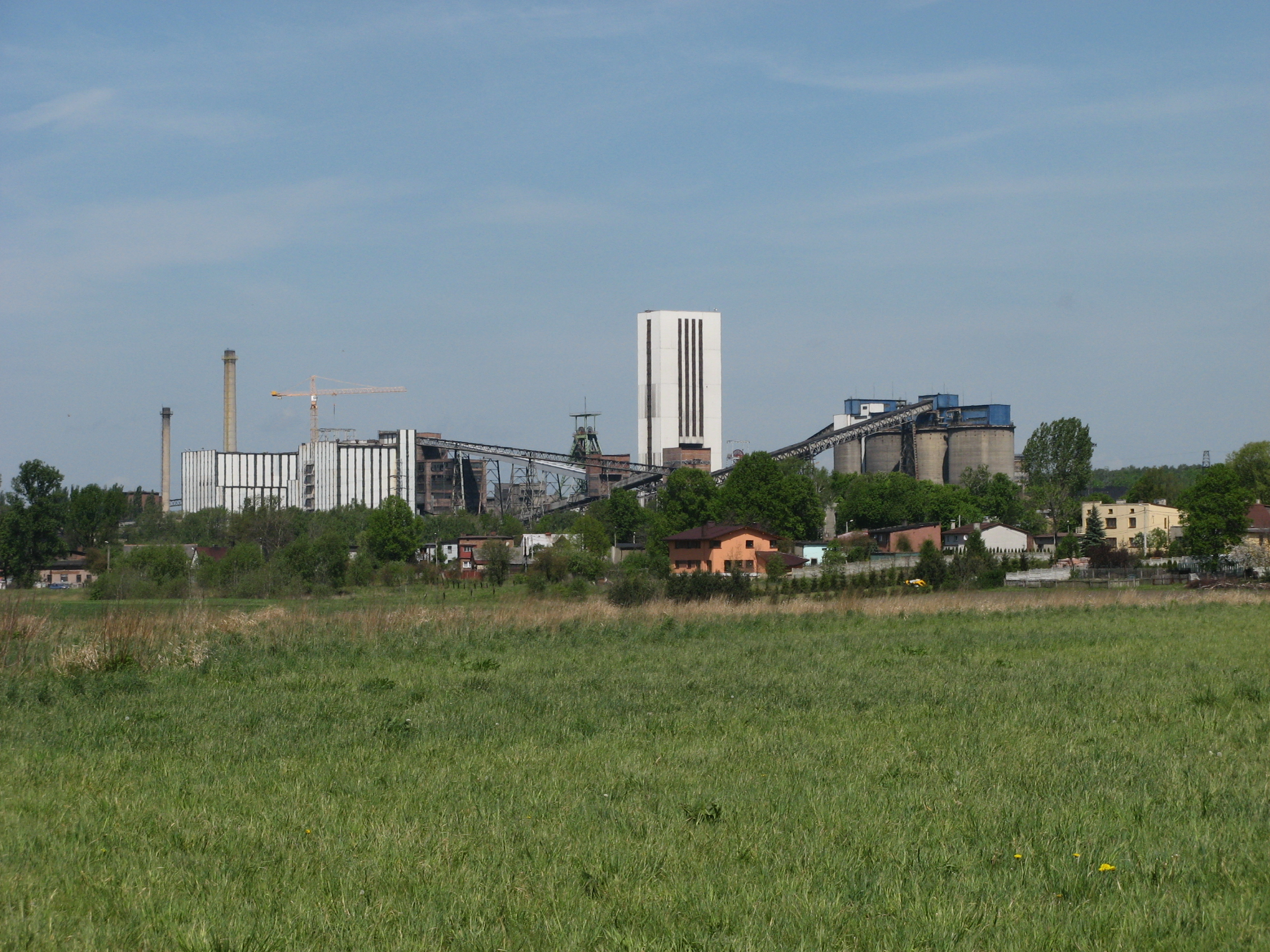

- Location in Poland
- Location: Halemba, Ruda Śląska, Silesian Voivodeship, Poland; 50°14′38″N 018°51′07″E
- Products: Coal
- Production: 3,360,000
- Opened: 1897
- Company: Kompania Węglowa

The Halemba coal mine is a large mine in the south of Poland in Halemba district of Ruda Śląska, Silesian Voivodeship, 273 km south-west of the capital, Warsaw. Halemba represents one of the largest coal reserves in Poland, having estimated reserves of 120 million tonnes of coal. The annual coal production is around 3.36 million tonnes.

== Explosion ==
In a mining explosion in November 2006, 23 miners died. A similar accident happened in 1990, when 19 miners died, and 20 were injured.

The explosion happened 21 November, 16:30 Polish time, at depth 1030m. The rescue action was hindered due to high concentration of methane and high temperature.

The cause of explosion was reported to be ignition of methane.

Polish president Lech Kaczyński declared national mourning in Poland from 23 November to 25 November.

== See also ==
- Halemba Power Station
