= Halemba Power Station =

Power station in Poland

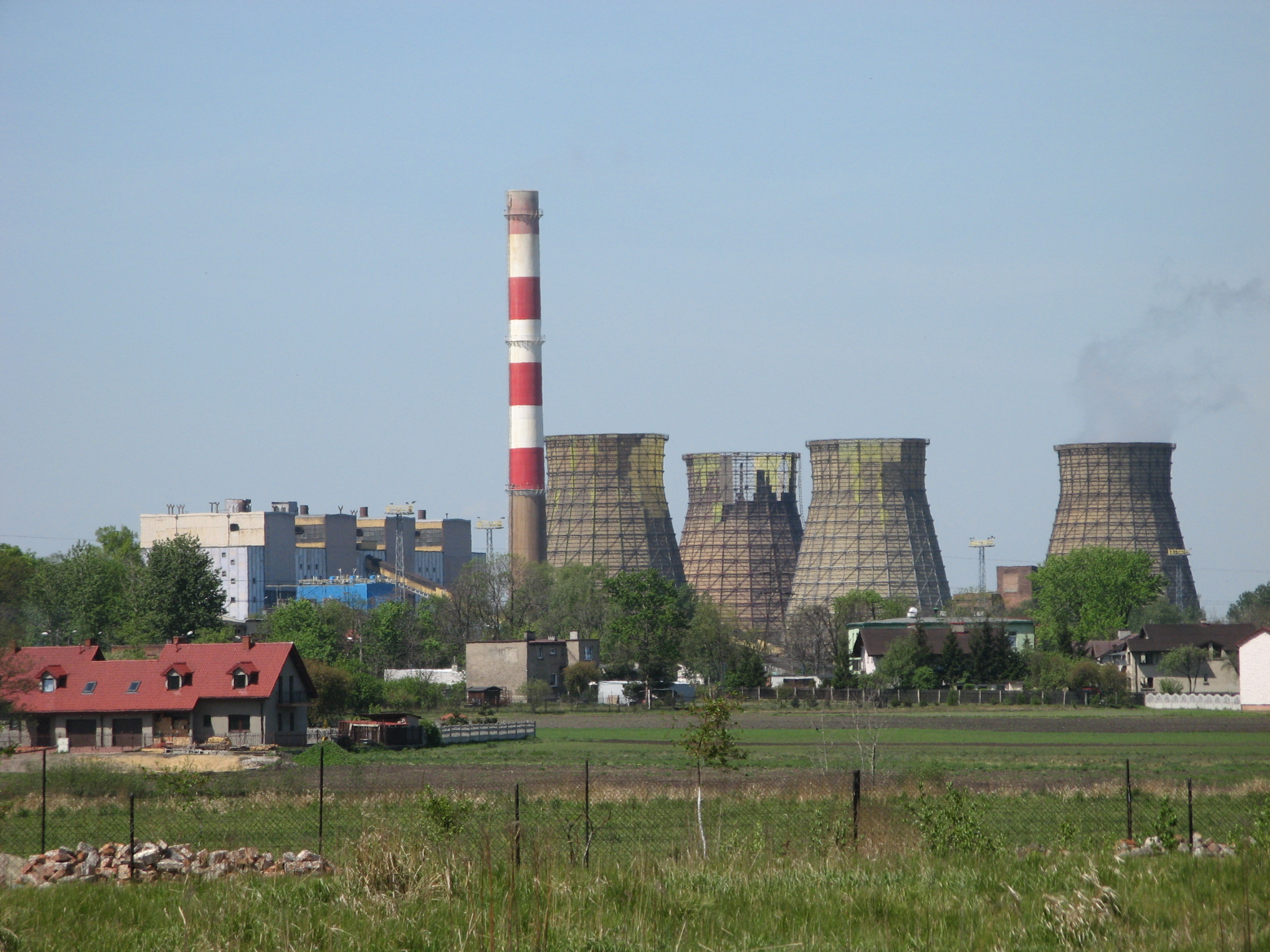
- Official name: Elektrownia Halemba
- Country: Poland
- Location: Halemba, Ruda Śląska
- Coordinates: 50°13′57″N 18°51′07″E
- Status: Operational
- Construction began: 1943
- Commission date: 1962
- Decommission date: 1 April 2012
- Owner: Południowy Koncern Energetyczny S.A.
- Thermal capacity: 60 MWt

Power generation
- Make and model: Zemech
- Units decommissioned: 200 MW
- Nameplate capacity: 200 MW

External links
- Website: elhalemba.com.pl
- Commons: Related media on Commons

Halemba Power Station (Polish: Elektrownia Halemba) is a coal-fueled power plant in Halemba district of Ruda Śląska, Silesian Voivodeship, Poland.

Construction of the plant begun in 1943, organized by Nazi German administration of occupied Poland, and using forced labor from Auschwitz Concentration Camp. After the war the plant was finished by the authorities in the People's Republic of Poland, and started operation in 1962. Since 2006, it has reduced operation, and was decommissioned on 1 April 2012.

== See also ==
- Halemba Coal Mine
- List of power stations in Poland
