= Chebzie =

- Ruda Śląska District
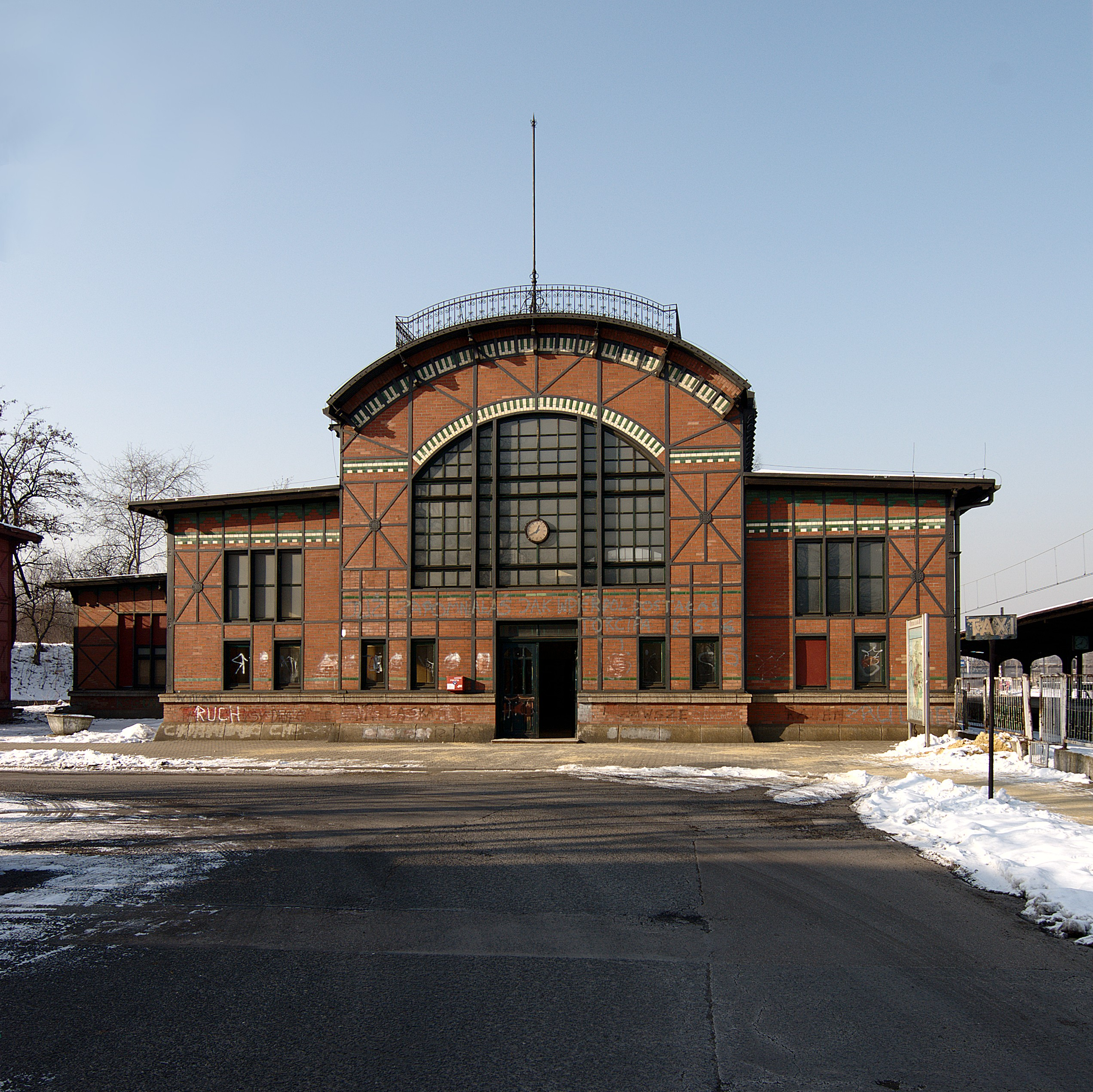
- Train station

- Location of Chebzie within Ruda Śląska
- Coordinates: 50°18′04″N 18°52′54″E
- Country: Poland
- Voivodeship: Silesian
- County/City: Ruda Śląska
- First mentioned: 1844
- Within city limits: 1959

Area
  - Total: 1.7 km^{2} (0.66 sq mi)

Population (2006)
  - Total: 1,101
  - Density: 650/km^{2} (1,700/sq mi)
- Time zone: UTC+1 (CET)
  - Summer (DST): UTC+2 (CEST)
- Area code: (+48) 032
- Vehicle registration: SL, SRS
- Primary airport: Katowice Airport

Chebzie (German: Morgenroth) is a district in the east of Ruda Śląska, Silesian Voivodeship, southern Poland. It has an area of 1.7 km^{2} and was inhabited by 1,101 people.

== History ==
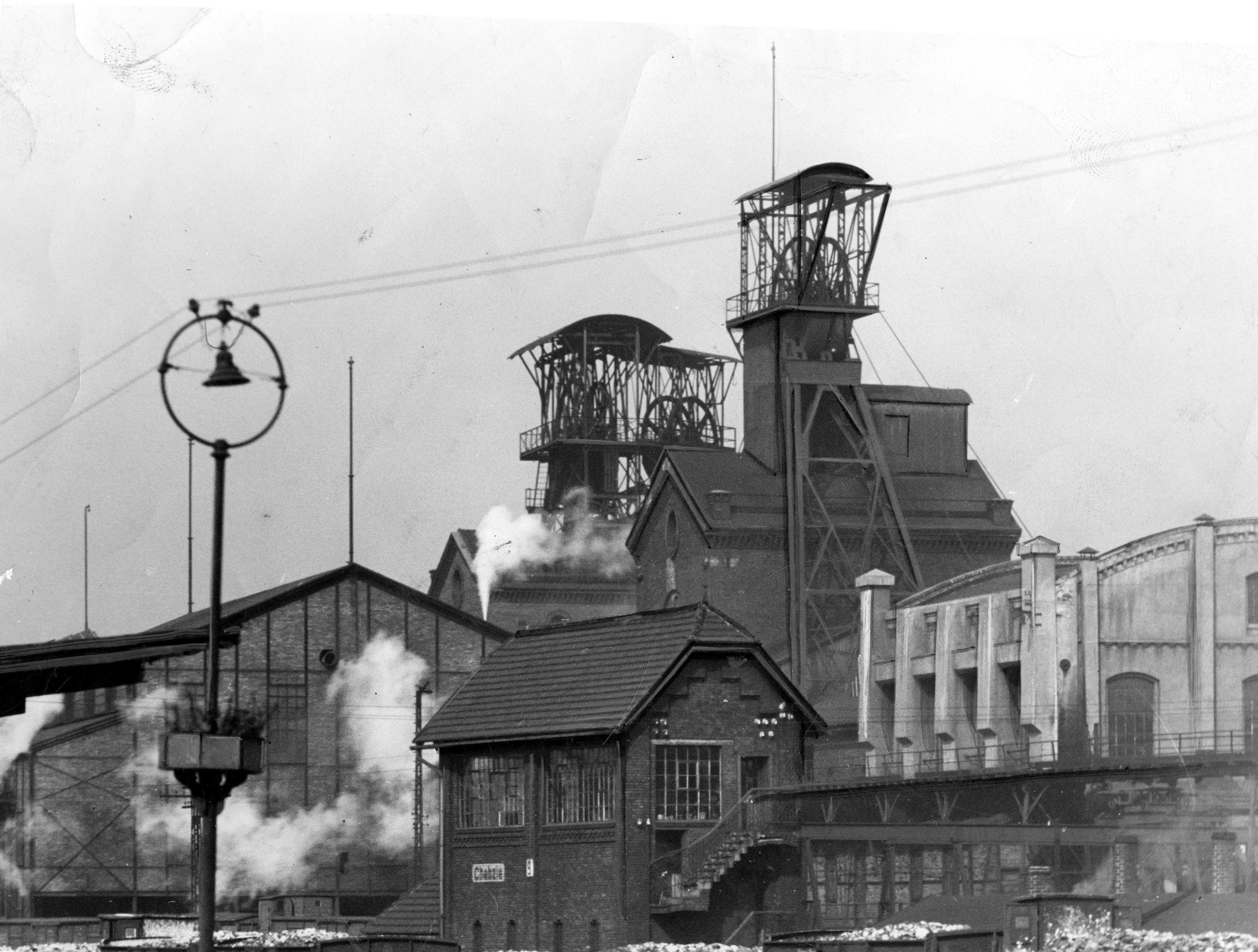
Paweł Coal Mine in Chebzie in the 1930s

The settlement evolved around an inn built in the late 18th century. As Hebzie it was first mentioned in 1844. The Gute Hoffnung zinc smelter was opened in 1822; the Morgenroth smelter began to operate in 1925.

During the German occupation of Poland (World War II), the Germans established and operated the E83 forced labour subcamp of the Stalag VIII-B/344 prisoner-of-war camp in the settlement.

After World War II Chebzie belonged to gmina Godula, but was split off and merged into Nowy Bytom in 1951, and as part of Nowy Bytom was amalgamated with Ruda to form Ruda Śląska on December 31, 1958.
