= Friedrichsdorf (disambiguation) =

Friedrichsdorf is a town in Germany.

Friedrichsdorf, literally meaning "Friedrich's village" is also a former name of:

- Darskowo, Drawsko County, Poland
- Bykowina, Poland
- Frydrychowo, Wąbrzeźno County, Poland
- Mykolaivka, Oskil rural hromada, Izium Raion, Kharkiv Oblast, Ukraine
- Nova Gradiška, Croatia
