= Godula =

- Ruda Śląska District
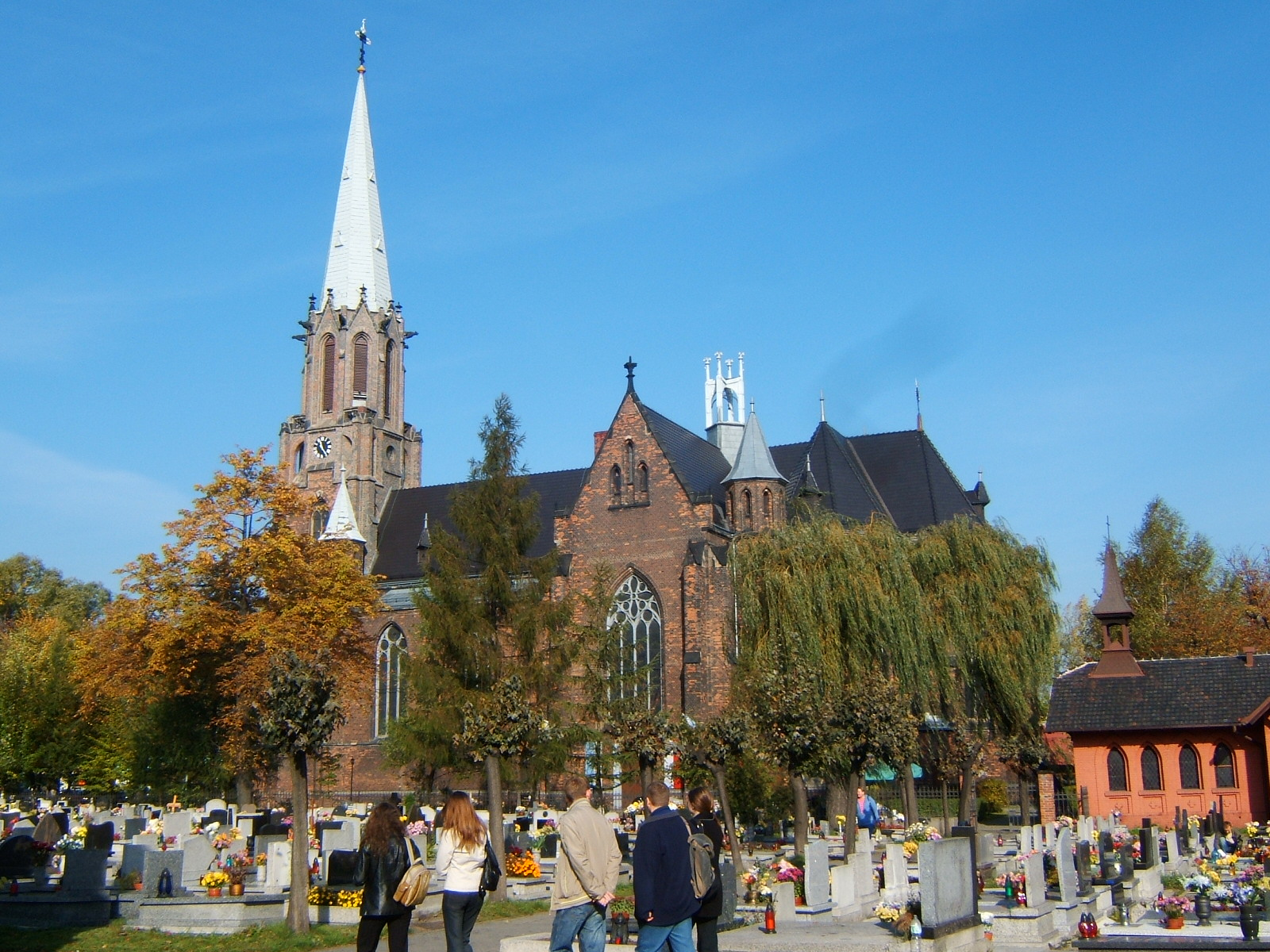
- Church of the Beheading of Saint John the Baptist

- Location of Godula within Ruda Śląska
- Coordinates: 50.314817°N 18.881764°E
- Country: Poland
- Voivodeship: Silesian
- County/City: Ruda Śląska

Area
  - Total: 1.8 km^{2} (0.69 sq mi)

Population (2006)
  - Total: 12,151
  - Density: 6,800/km^{2} (17,000/sq mi)
- Time zone: UTC+1 (CET)
  - Summer (DST): UTC+2 (CEST)
- Area code: (+48) 032

Godula (German: Godullahütte) is a district in the north-east of Ruda Śląska, Silesian Voivodeship, southern Poland. It has an area of 1.8 km^{2} and in 2006 it was inhabited by 12,151 people.

== History ==
Originally the area belonged to Orzegów, whose landed property was bought by Karl Godulla, after whom the settlement was named. The zinc smelter Godullahütte was built after his death, 1854–55, and operated until 1919. Adjacent to the establishment developed a working class settlement later called Godula, the first 21 buildings were built in years 1858–61. The church of the Beheading of Saint John the Baptist was under construction since 1867. Trams communication was opened in the 1890s.

After World War I in the Upper Silesia plebiscite 2,178 out of 3,516 voters in Gutshof Orzegow, encompassing Godula, voted in favour of joining Poland, against 1,332 opting for staying in Germany. Afterwards it became a part of Silesian Voivodeship, Second Polish Republic. Officially the municipality Godula was established in 1924 and had this year around 9,000 inhabitants. It was then annexed by Nazi Germany at the beginning of World War II. After the war it was restored to Poland.

Godula constituted a gmina (municipality) that was merged into Ruda in 1951, and as part of Ruda was amalgamated with Nowy Bytom to form Ruda Śląska on December 31, 1958.
