= Wenanty Fuhl =

Polish footballer

Personal information
- Date of birth: 2 December 1960 (age 65)
- Place of birth: Ruda Śląska, Poland
- Height: 1.84 m (6 ft 0 in)
- Positions: Defender; midfielder

Youth career
- Urania Ruda Śląska

Senior career*
Years	Team	Apps	(Gls)
1980–1982	Szombierki Bytom	47	(2)
1982–1983	Schalke 04	0	(0)
1983–1984	Wiener Sportclub	24	(4)
1984–1985	1. FC Nürnberg	8	(0)
1985–1986	TSV Havelse		
1986–1994	1. FC Saarbrücken	226	(21)
1994–1995	SC Hauenstein	25	(1)
1995–1996	FC 08 Homburg	15	(1)
- * Club domestic league appearances and goals

Wenanty Fuhl (born 2 December 1960) is a Polish former professional footballer who played as a defender or midfielder.
