= Johanna von Schaffgotsch =

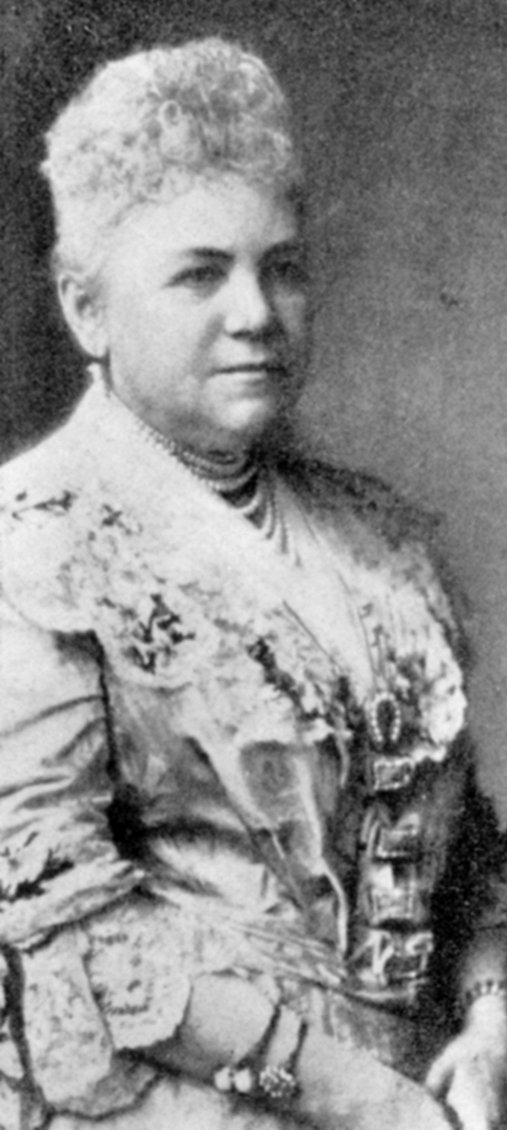
Johanna von Schaffgotsch (cropped)

Johanna von Schaffgotsch (née Gryzik, later Gryzik von Schomberg-Godulla; 1842–1910) was the adopted daughter of Karl Godulla. She was the first businesswoman in the history of Silesia, as well as one of the richest women in Europe; the combined wealth of von Schaffgotsch and her spouse was estimated to be 79 million marks.

== See ==
- ch family
