= Robor =

Gaulish god

In Gallo-Roman religion, Robor or Roboris was a god invoked alongside the genius loci on a single inscription found in Angoulême.
