= Karl Godulla =

Silesian industrialist

Karl Godulla, Carolus Godulla, in Polish spelled Karol Godula (born 8 November 1781 in Makoschau, today Makoszowy, a subdivision of Zabrze, Silesia; died 6 July 1848 in Breslau, today Wrocław) was a Silesian self-made industrialist ("the king of zinc"), and one of the best-known pioneers in the industrial development of Prussian Silesia.

== Life ==
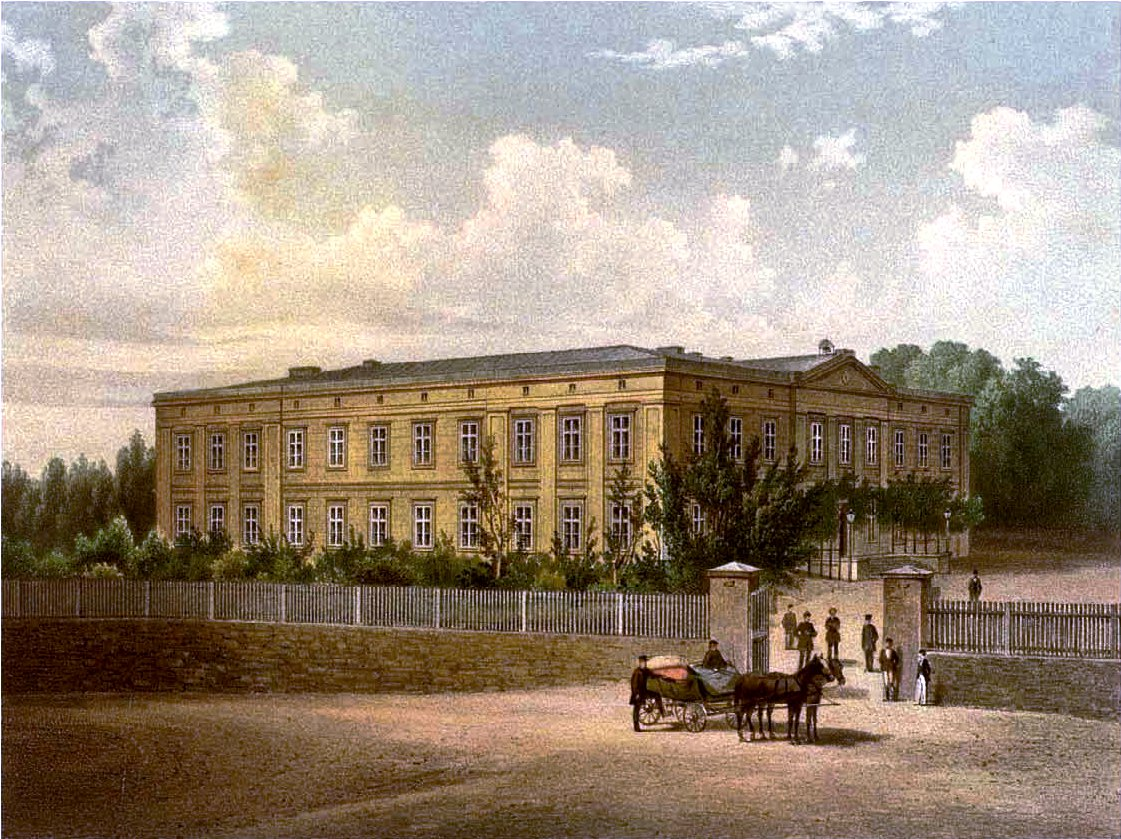
Godulla's palace at Schomberg about 1860. Painting by Alexander Duncker

Godulla grew up in modest conditions and went into the services to Count von Ballestrem, who promoted the intelligent, ambitious and skillful young man. In 1807, Godulla was promoted to be the manager at the count estate, and in 1818 ascended to become the overseer of all his goods. In 1812, the zinc smelter "Karlhütte" construction began, and Godulla became its manager. He received from the count 28 shares ("freikuxen") in this new smelter, and this started his own business career.

Soon, Godulla acquired his own coal mines, calamine mines and zinc smelters (such as the Szarlej mine). He attained a large fortune, partly through introduction of new industrial processes into the fast developing industry of Silesia. By the time of his death, Godulla owned 80 zinc mines, 4 zinc smelters, 48 coal mines and considerable real estate. Godulla was considered to be an economic person, who lived rather in his little wooden house in Ruda Śląska than in his palace at Schomberg (Szombierki), nowadays, a subdivision of Bytom. He was also known to be very industrious man, who allowed himself little peace, and who imposed these standards on his employees and workers of his industrial establishments. He declined knighthood allegedly stating that "the greatest nobility comes from the memory of an actful life".

== Legacy ==
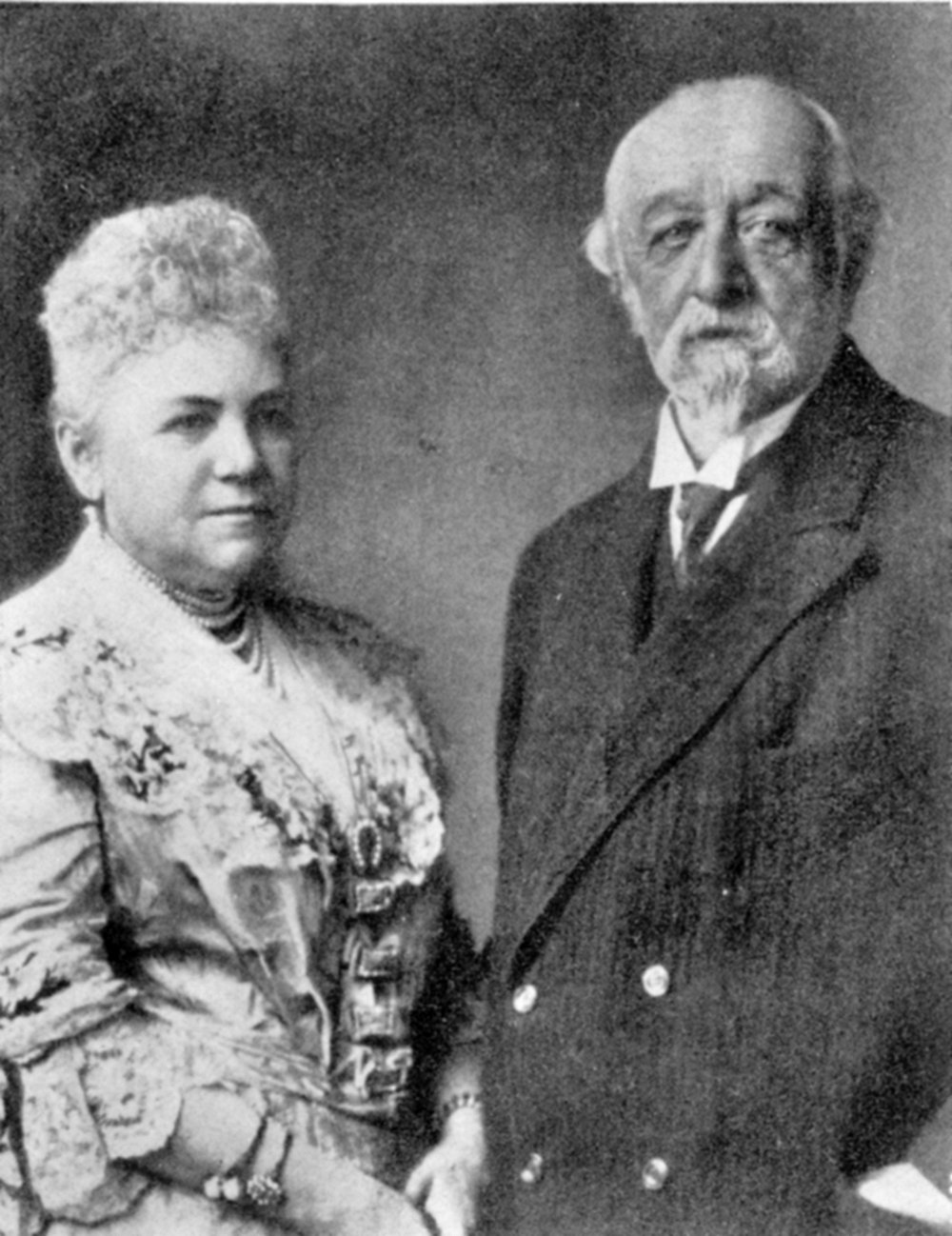
Johanna and Hans-Ulrich Schaffgotsch (1908)

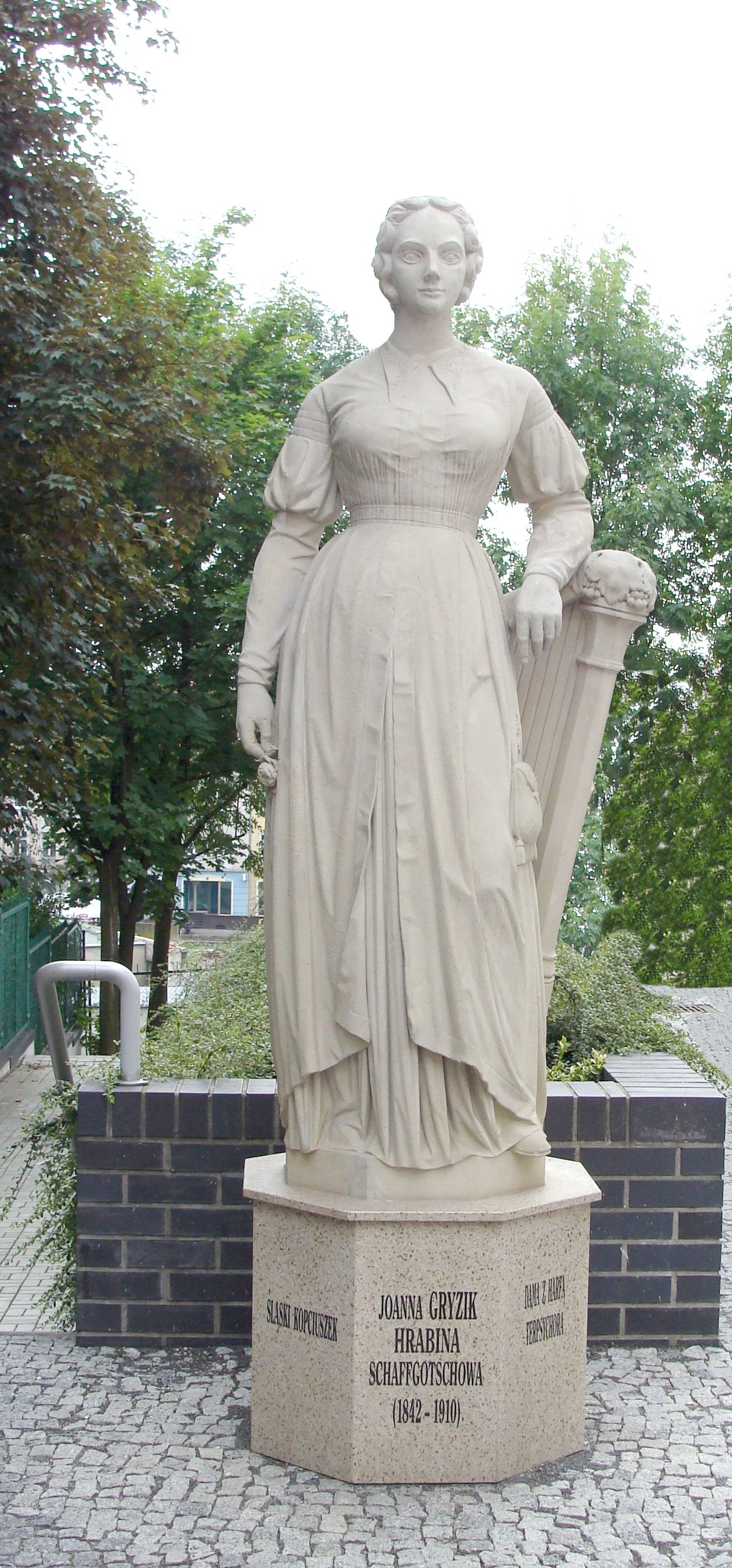
A modern monument to Johanna Gryzik in Opole calling her "a Silesian Cinderella"

Godulla remained unmarried and childless. He adopted a child of a worker, Johanna Gryzik (1842–1910), who at the age of 6 inherited Godulla's fortune, at 16 was ennobled by Friedrich Wilhelm IV to Gryzik von Schomberg-Godulla, a month later married count Hans Ulrich von Schaffgotsch, and then successfully administered by herself the business empire, one of the largest in Germany. After World War II, the descendants of the family were expelled from Silesia, her grave was emptied, and most of the property destroyed.

A subdivision of Ruda Śląska (Godula, de:Godullahütte) has historically been named after Carolus Godulla. Following the fall of communism, the Godula Upper-Silesian Higher Business School in Chorzów was established. Godula's name was also given to a college in Ruda Śląska-Halemba (Zespół Szkół Ponadgimnazjalnych nr 3) and a primary school in Ruda Śląska-Godula (Szkoła Podstawowa Nr 40) and a high school in Bytom-Szombierki (Gimnazjum Nr 6). His daughter's name has recently (2007) been given to an elementary school (3) in Ruda Śląska (in today's Polish version, her name is spelled "hrabina Joanna Gryzik von Schaffgotsch").

== Legends ==
As a young man, Godulla was disfigured, possibly by poachers, with business of whose he successfully interfered (part of his hired job). He lost an eye, use of one hand, had a disfigured face, permanent limp, and (allegedly) lost masculinity. Folk legends had it that he cut a deal with the devil (this was to explain his exceptionally good business fortune, the late-night experiments in chemistry, and personal oddities).

== Sources ==
- Peter Szczepanek, "Godulla und der Anfang der oberschlesischen Industrie", Echo Slonska, 2002-05-06 (in German)
- "Karol Godula", Echo Slonska, 2002-10-9, (in Polish)
- Excerpt from: Urbanek: "Carl Godulla und sein Werk" (www.prosilesia.net)
- Wie ich den Godulla suchen ging, (Hans Nowak describes his novel "Godulla" in the newspaper article Zink wird Gold, DIE ZEIT, 1949)
- Ostdeutsche-Biographie: Karl Godulla, Bergbauunternehmer (with further literature)
