= Ruda, Ruda Śląska =

Ruda
- Ruda Śląska District
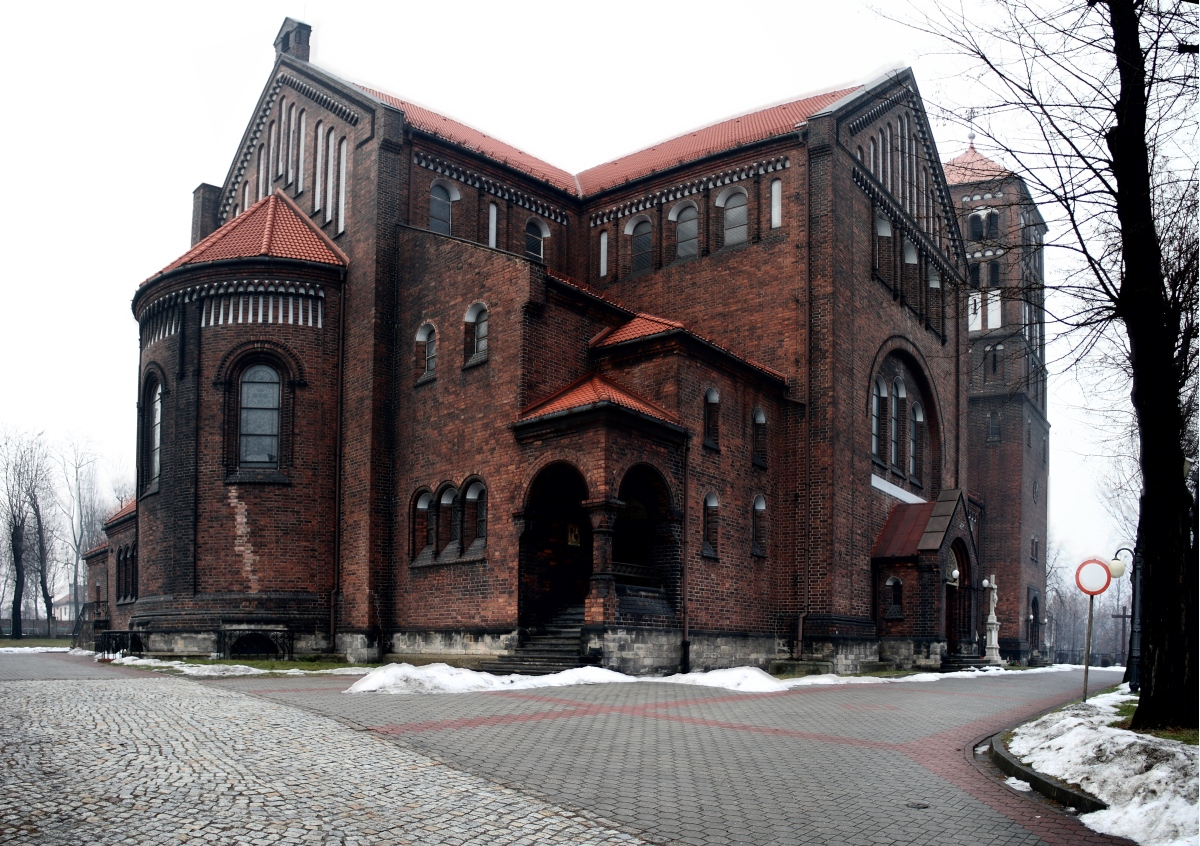
- Saint Joseph church

- Location of Ruda within Ruda Śląska
- Coordinates: 50°18′42″N 18°51′05″E
- Country: Poland
- Voivodeship: Silesian
- County/City: Ruda Śląska

Area
  - Total: 11.9 km^{2} (4.6 sq mi)

Population (2006)
  - Total: 23,134
  - Density: 1,940/km^{2} (5,040/sq mi)
- Time zone: UTC+1 (CET)
  - Summer (DST): UTC+2 (CEST)
- Area code: (+48) 032

Ruda (German: Ruda) is a district in the north-west of Ruda Śląska, Silesian Voivodeship, southern Poland. It has an area of 11.9 km^{2} and in 2006 it was inhabited by 23,134 people.

== History ==
The village was first mentioned in a Latin document of Diocese of Wrocław called Liber fundationis episcopatus Vratislaviensis from around 1305 as item in Ruda sunt L mansi parvi, de quibus scultetus habet VI), alii deserviunt domino episcopo. Decima de omni grano. Et scultetus solvit ) marcam de molendino suo.. The village belonged initially to the Duchy of Bytom, a fee of the Kingdom of Bohemia, which after 1526 became a part of the Habsburg monarchy. After the Silesian Wars the area became a part of the Kingdom of Prussia. Between 1816 and 1908 the biggest zinc smelter in Europe, "Carlshütte", operated in Ruda. It was accompanied by numerous other industrial establishments.

After World War I in the Upper Silesia plebiscite 6,212 out of 10,352 voters in Ruda voted in favour of joining Poland, against 4,105 opting for staying in Germany. Afterwards it became a part of Silesian Voivodeship, Second Polish Republic. It was then annexed by Nazi Germany at the beginning of World War II. After the war it was restored to Poland.

Ruda received town rights in 1939, in effect after World War II. In 1951 Godula, Orzegów and Chebzie were amalgamated with Ruda, and on December 31, 1958, it was merged with the town Nowy Bytom to form the modern Ruda Śląska.
