= Ruda Śląska =

City in Silesian Voivodeship, Poland

Ruda Śląska Wielgŏ Ruda (Silesian)
- City county
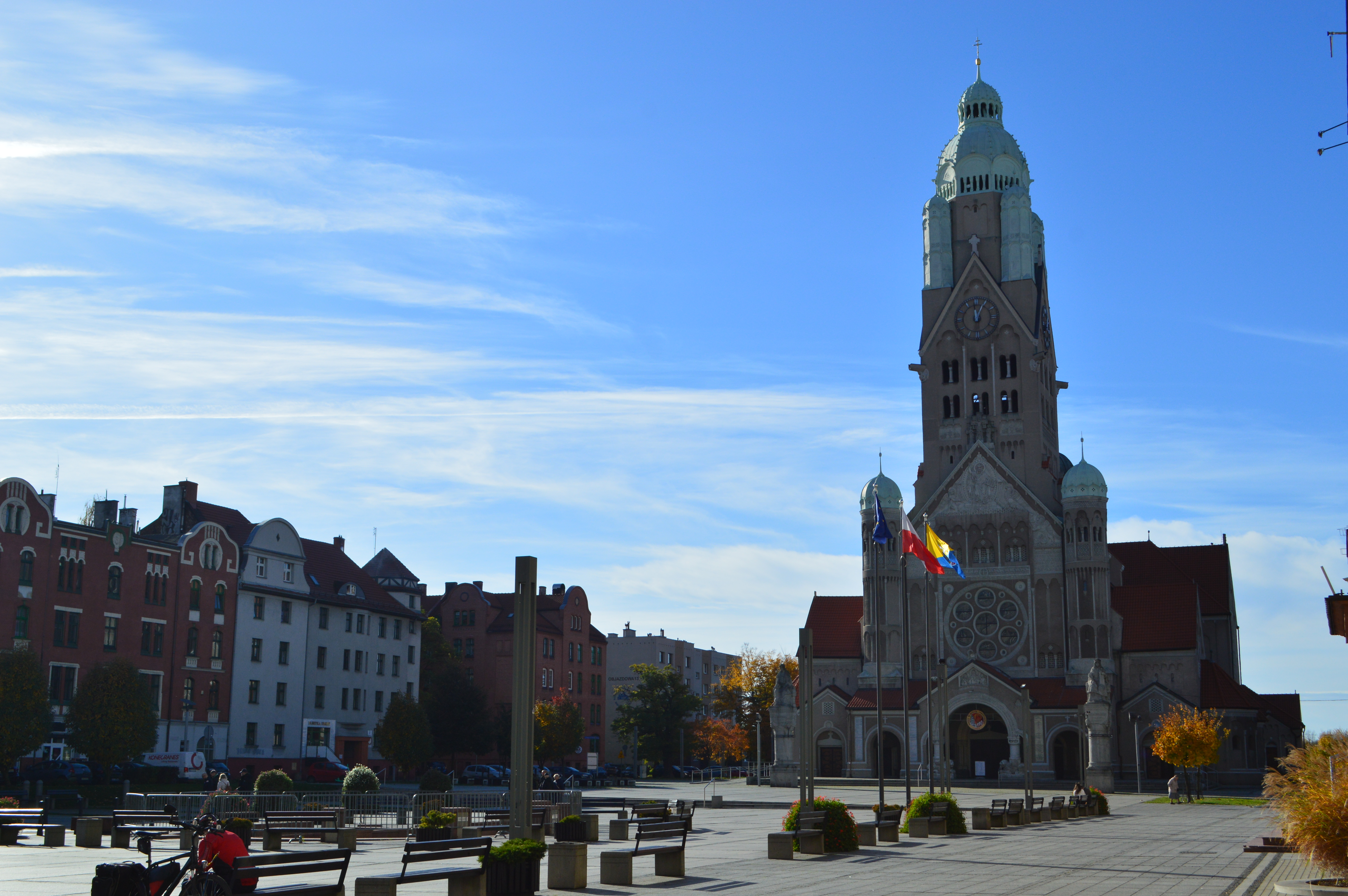
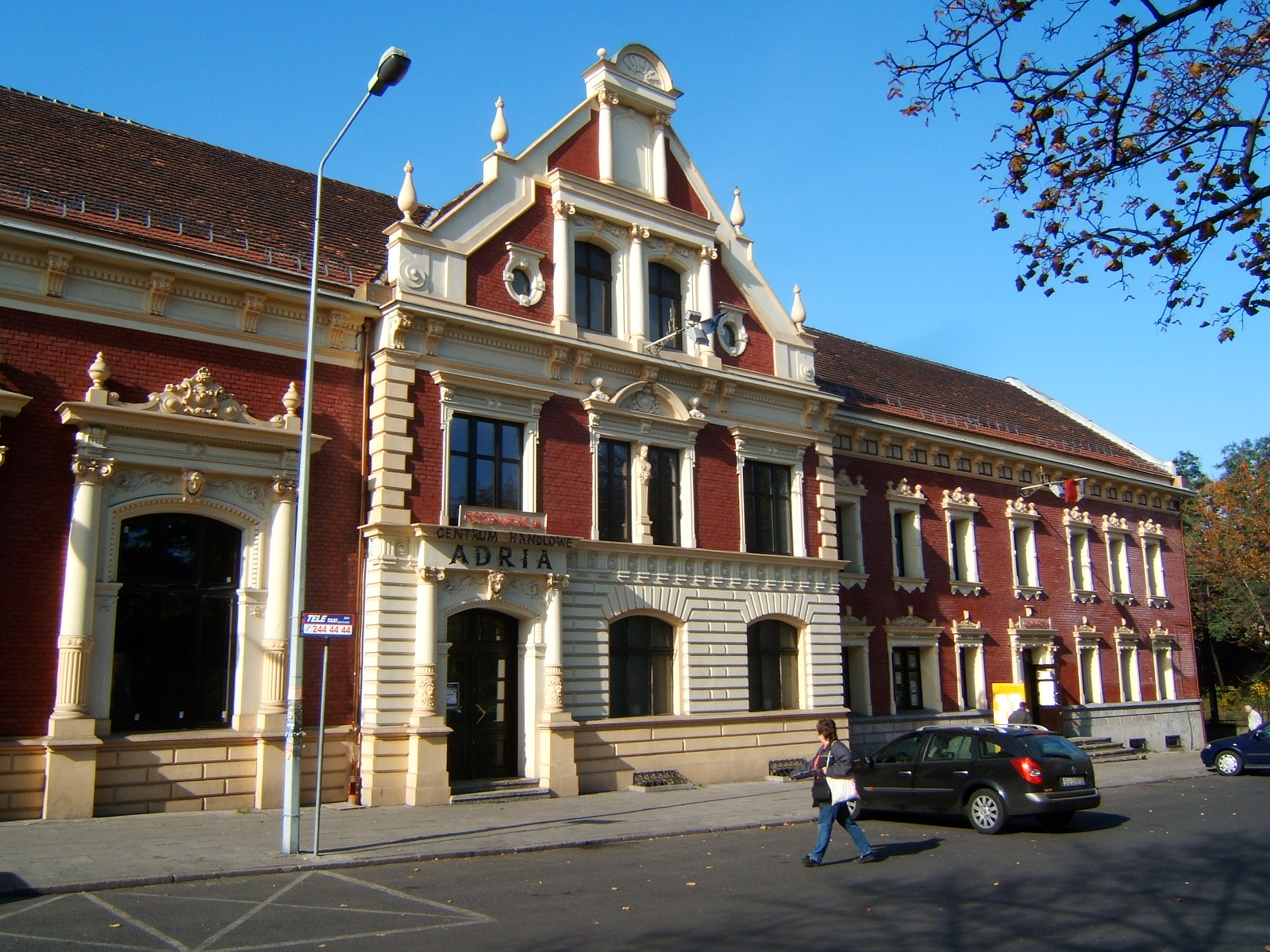
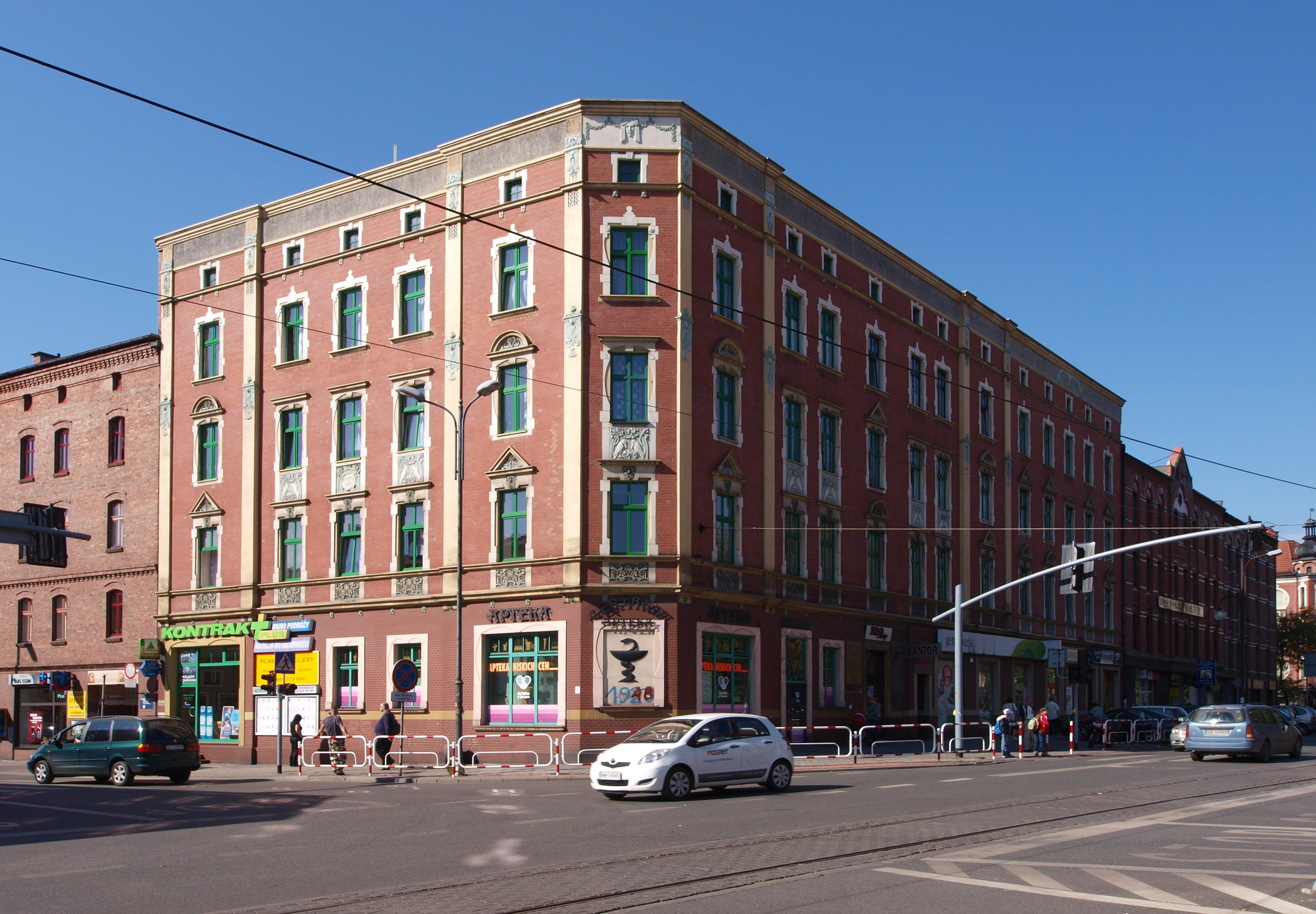
- From top, left to right: Main square with the St. Paul the Apostle Church, Wawel Community Centre, Niedurnego Street

- Flag Coat of arms Logo

- Location within Poland
- Coordinates: 50°15′46″N 18°51′13″E
- Country: Poland
- Voivodeship: Silesian
- County: city county
- Established: 13th century
- Town rights: 1959

Government
  - Mayor: Michał Pierończyk

Area
  - City county: 77.73 km^{2} (30.01 sq mi)
- Highest elevation: 321 m (1,053 ft)
- Lowest elevation: 225 m (738 ft)

Population (31 December 2021)
  - City county: 135,008 ▼ (26th)
  - Density: 1,760/km^{2} (4,600/sq mi)
  - Urban: 2,746,000
  - Metro: 4,620,624
- Time zone: UTC+1 (CET)
  - Summer (DST): UTC+2 (CEST)
- Postal code: 41–700 to 41–718
- Area code: +48 32
- Car plates: SRS, SL
- Primary airport: Katowice Airport
- Website: http://www.rudaslaska.pl/

Ruda Śląska (Note: Pronunciation: [ˈruda ˈɕlɔ̃ska]; German: Ruda O.S.; Silesian: Silesian PLS alphabet: Ślůnsko Ruda, Wjelgo Ruda) (German: Ruda O.S.; Silesian: Wielgo Ruda) is a city in Silesia in southern Poland, near Katowice. It is a city in the Metropolis GZM, a metropolis with a population of two million. It is in the Silesian Highlands, on the Kłodnica River (tributary of the Oder).

It has been part of the Silesian Voivodeship since its formation in 1999. Previously, it was in Katowice Voivodeship, and before then, part of the Autonomous Silesian Voivodeship. Ruda Śląska is one of the cities in the Katowice urban area (population 2.7 million) and within the greater Katowice-Ostrava metropolitan area (population 5,294,000). The population of the city is 135,008 (December 2021).

== History ==
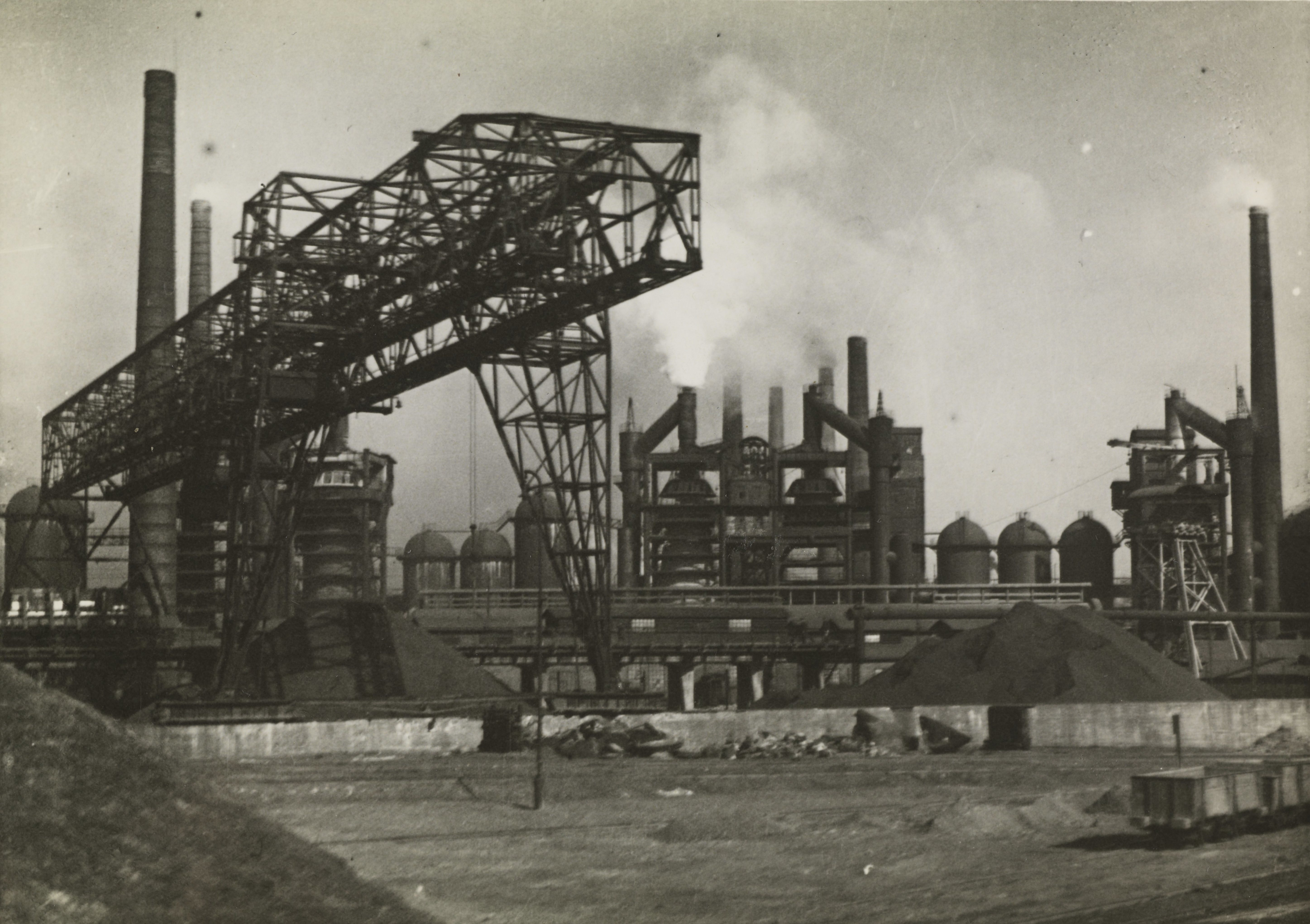
Pokój ironworks in the interbellum

A large village is known to have existed at the location of the present day city center in 1243. The city name appears to indicate the awareness and perhaps exploitation of ores from early times.

The area underwent rapid industrialization (coal, steel, zinc) in the 19th and the beginning of 20th century. However, it remained a cluster of industrial settlements and villages until the 1950s, when it was administratively united. However, it never developed into a truly unified city.

Before the German invasion of Poland and the outbreak of World War II, in 1939, German saboteurs carried out an attack in Ruda. Following the invasion, the area was under German occupation from 1939 to 1945. Several Polish teachers from present-day Ruda Śląska were murdered by the Germans in concentration camps as part of the Intelligenzaktion. The Germans also established and operated a Polenlager forced labour camp for Poles in the present-day district of Kochłowice, and the E83 forced labour subcamp of the Stalag VIII-B/344 prisoner-of-war camp in the present-day district of Chebzie. The Polish resistance movement was active in the area. In 1945, the German occupation ended, and the area was restored to Poland, although with a Soviet-installed communist regime, which then stayed in power until the fall of communism in the 1980s.

Historical population
Year	Pop.	±%
1950	33,962	—
1960	131,667	+287.7%
1970	143,122	+8.7%
1980	159,097	+11.2%
1990	171,034	+7.5%
2000	152,280	−11.0%
2010	142,950	−6.1%
2020	136,423	−4.6%

After the fall of communism in 1989, the significant heavy industry was largely scaled down or restructured. The area has been transforming to a service-based economy. The well-known still operating coal mine is "Halemba".

Since 2007, Ruda Śląska has been a member of the Upper Silesian Metropolitan Union (predecessor to the Metropolis GZM), the largest legally recognized urban area in Poland.

== Transport and infrastructure ==
Significant roadways are Highway A4 and the Drogowa Trasa Średnicowa. There are several small railway stations, mainly on the line Katowice-Gliwice.

Since 1950, Ruda Śląska is the site of a transmission facility, which was used from 1950 to 1988 for medium-wave radio broadcasting.

== Higher education ==
The neighboring cities of Katowice and Gliwice are large academic centers. Ruda Śląska is a seat of the Higher Academy of Commerce (Wyższa Szkoła Handlowa).

== Sports ==
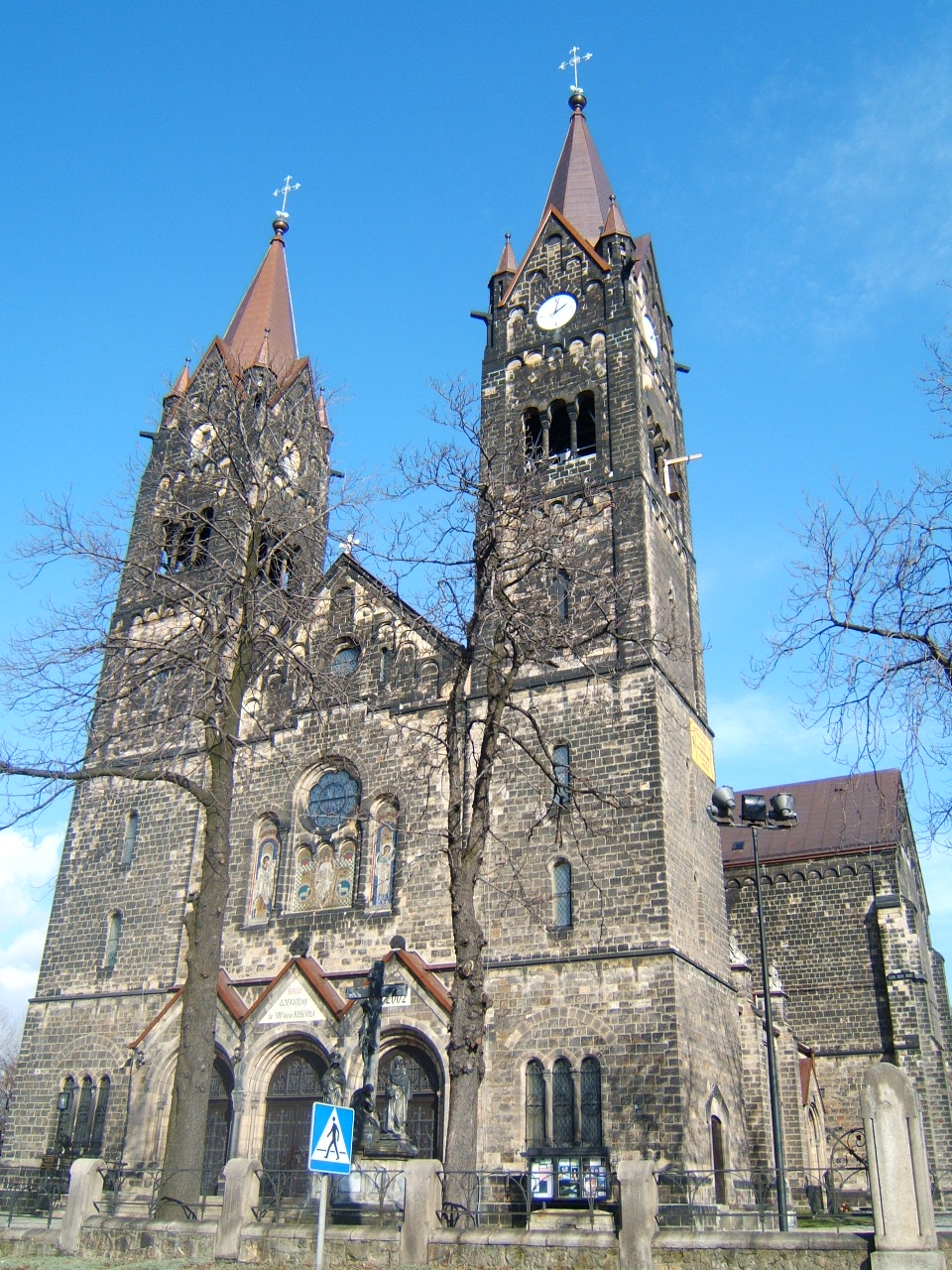
Holy Trinity Church

- Zgoda Ruda Śląska – women's handball team playing in Polish Ekstraklasa Women's Handball League
- Rugby Club IGLOO Ruda Śląska – men's rugby team playing in Polish Ekstraliga Rugby Seven's

== Subdivisions ==
The city of Ruda Śląska is divided into following subdivisions:

- Bielszowice
- Bykowina
- Chebzie
- Czarny Las
- Godula
- Halemba
- Kochłowice
- Nowy Bytom
- Orzegów
- Ruda
- Wirek

== Notable people ==
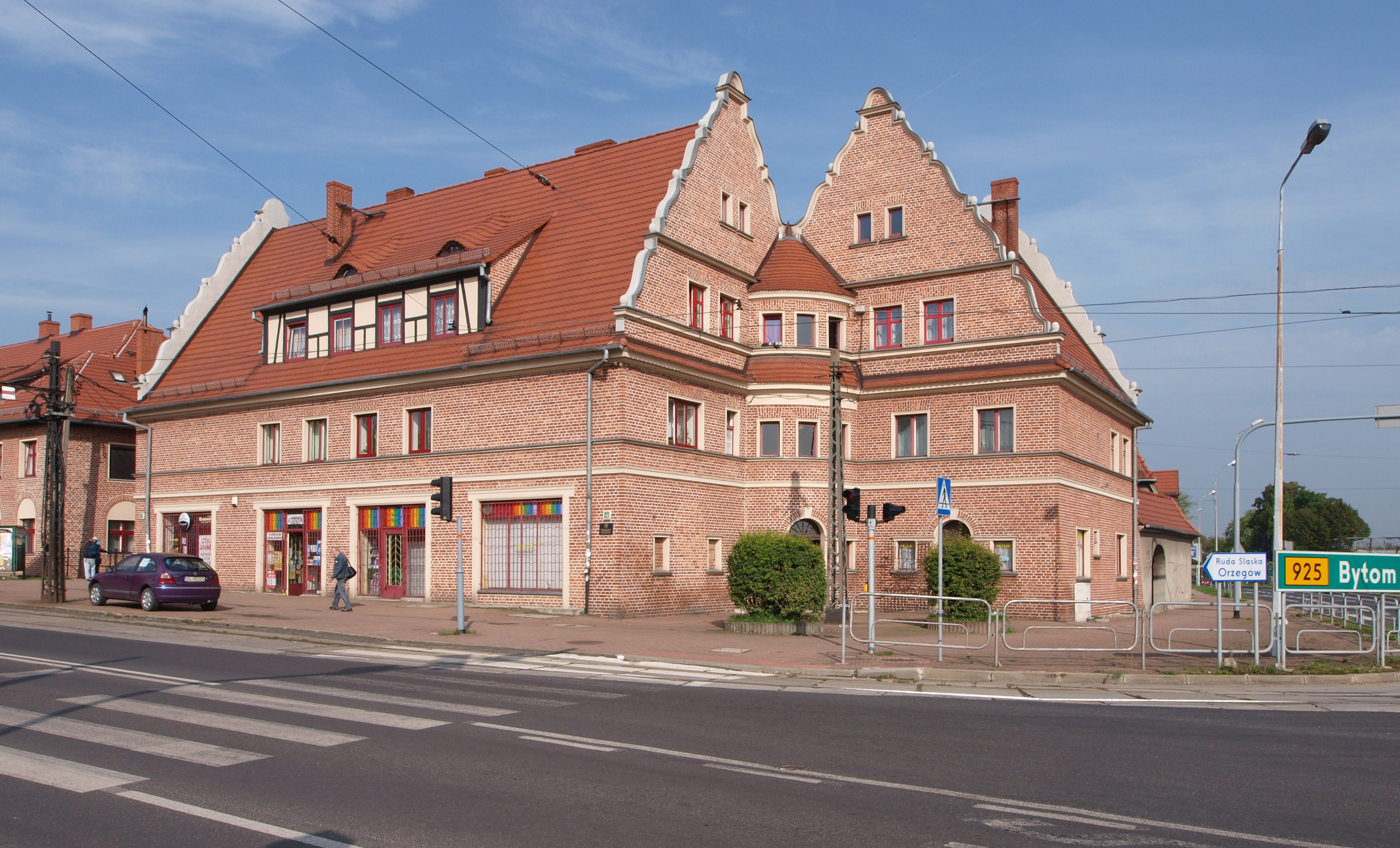
Liberty Street in Ruda Śląska

- Karl Godulla (1781–1848), German industrialist
- Günter Bialas (1907–1995), German composer
- Paweł Cyganek (1913–1995), footballer
- Ernest Pohl (1932–1995), footballer
- Erwin Wilczek (1940–2021), footballer
- Marcin Baszczynski (born 1977), footballer
- Marek Plawgo (born 1981), athlete
- Otylia Jędrzejczak (born 1983), Olympic gold medalist and world record-holder in swimming
- Kasia Moś (born 1987), singer and songwriter, represented Poland at the Eurovision Song Contest 2017
- Artur Sobiech (born 1990), footballer
- Kamil Grabara (born 1999), footballer
- Mateusz Bogusz (born 2001), footballer
- Jakub Kamiński (born 2002), footballer

Ruda Śląska is the largest population center in Poland never to have been visited by Lech Wałęsa. This is shown on a brass plaque on the side of the ratusz (town hall).

== Twin towns – sister cities ==
Ruda Śląska is twinned with:

- Carrickfergus, Northern Ireland, United Kingdom
- Levice, Slovakia
- Mank, Austria
- Vibo Valentia, Italy
