= Nowy Bytom =

- Ruda Śląska District
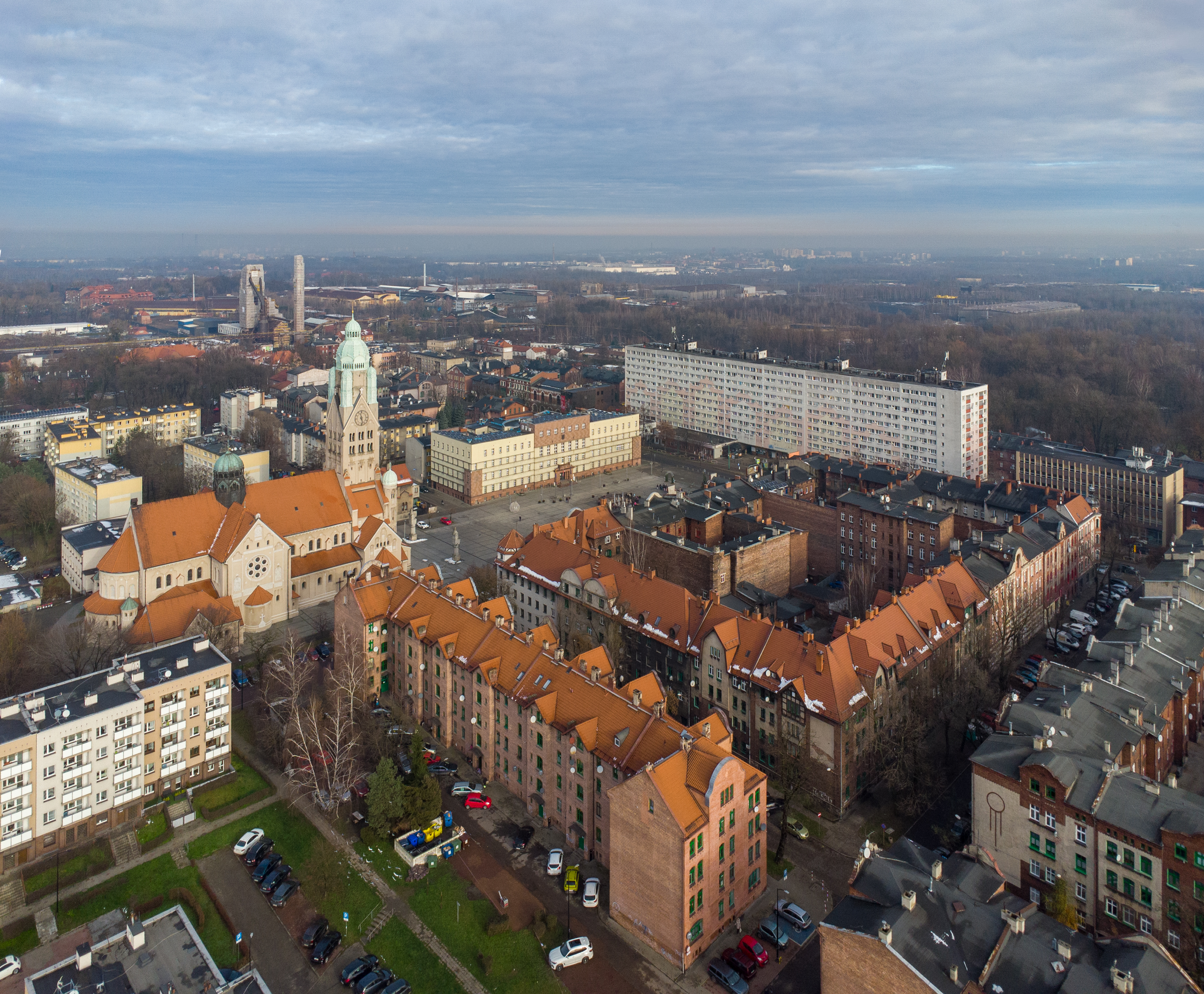
- Aerial view

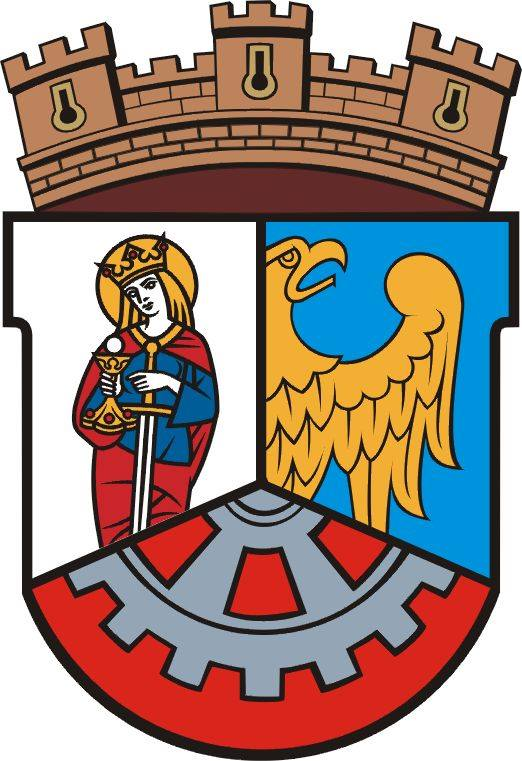
- Coat of arms

- Location of Nowy Bytom within Ruda Śląska
- Coordinates: 50°17′08″N 18°52′31″E
- Country: Poland
- Voivodeship: Silesian
- County/City: Ruda Śląska
- Time zone: UTC+1 (CET)
  - Summer (DST): UTC+2 (CEST)
- Area code: (+48) 032

Nowy Bytom (German: Friedenshütte) is a district serving as administrative centre of Ruda Śląska, Silesian Voivodeship, southern Poland. In 2006 it had an area of 4.6 km^{2} and was inhabited by 12,058 people. On January 12, 2006 a part of it was split off to form a new district, Czarny Las.

== History ==
Until the early 19th century the area was covered by Bytom's Black Forest (German: Beuthener Schwarzwald, Polish: Czarny Las), which was first mentioned in 1369. In the course of the 19th-century industrial development steel mills and coal mines had been established on its territory, among them Friedenshütte (Polish: Frydenshuta), after which a wider area took name. Administratively it formed an exclave of Bytom up to 1921. After World War I and the Upper Silesia plebiscite became a part of Silesian Voivodeship, Second Polish Republic and gained status of an independent municipality (gmina) named Nowy Bytom (lit. New Bytom) in place of colloquial Polish Frydenshuta (after the local steel mill) and temporarily Polski Bytom (lit. Polish Bytom). In 1929 Zgoda was split off to be joined with Świętochłowice. Nowy Bytom was then annexed by Nazi Germany at the beginning of World War II. After the war it was restored to Poland. In 1947 it gained town rights. In 1951 it absorbed Wirek. On December 31, 1958 it was amalgamated with Ruda to form contemporary Ruda Śląska.

== Famous people ==
Nowy Bytom is the place of birth for the Polish football legend Lucjan Brychczy.

== Gallery ==
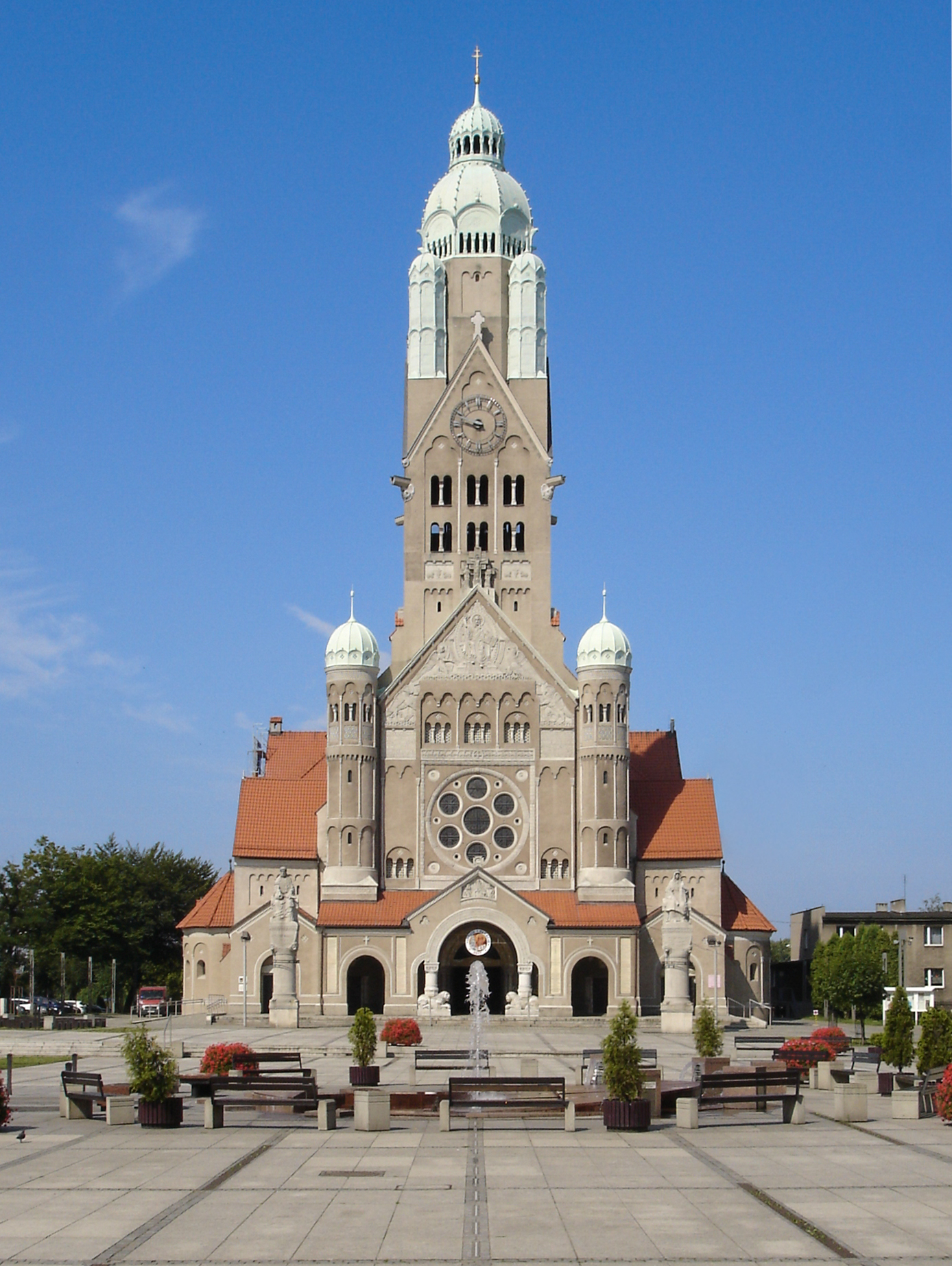
John Paul II Square, Saint Paul church

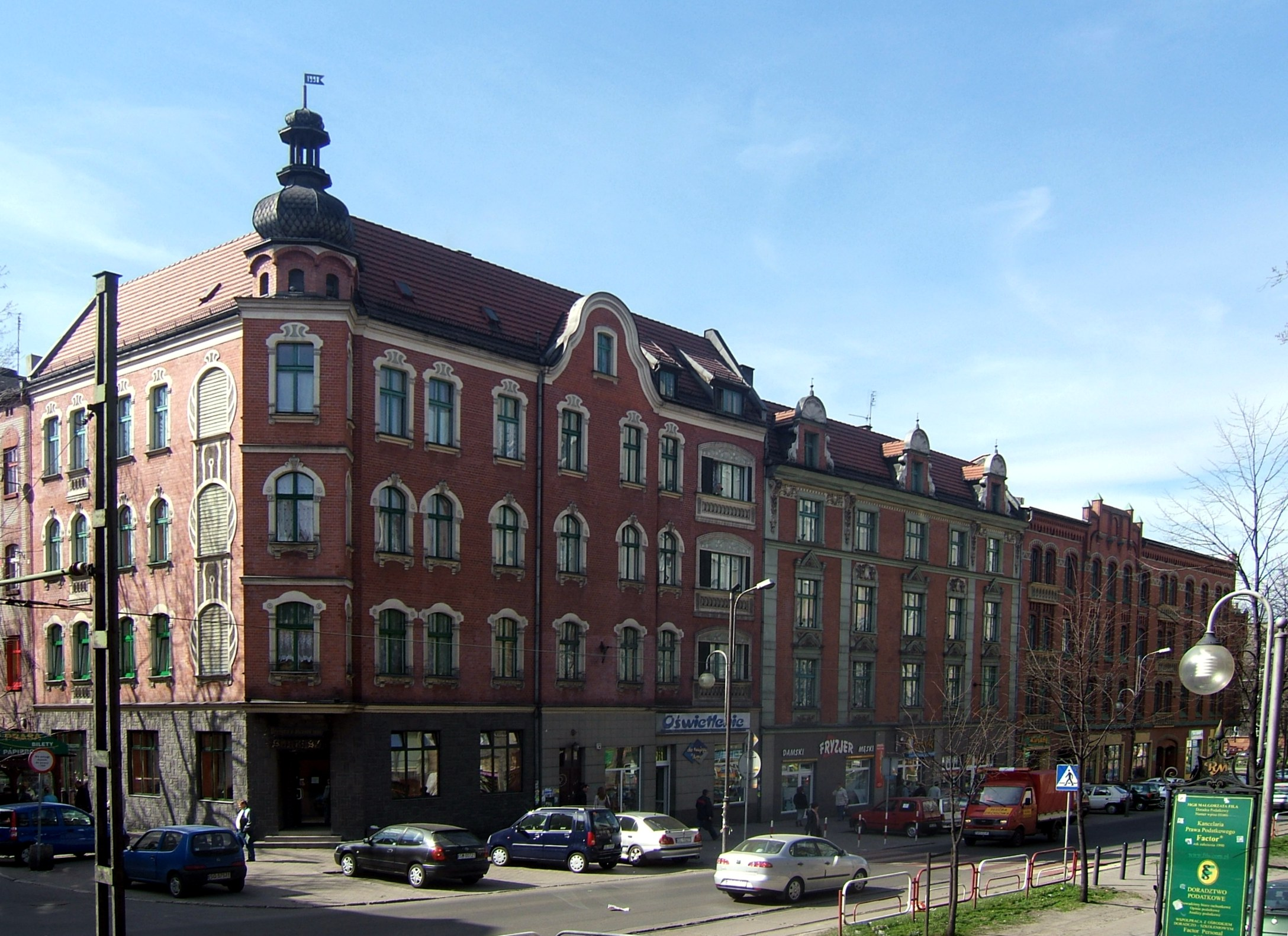
Niedurnego Street

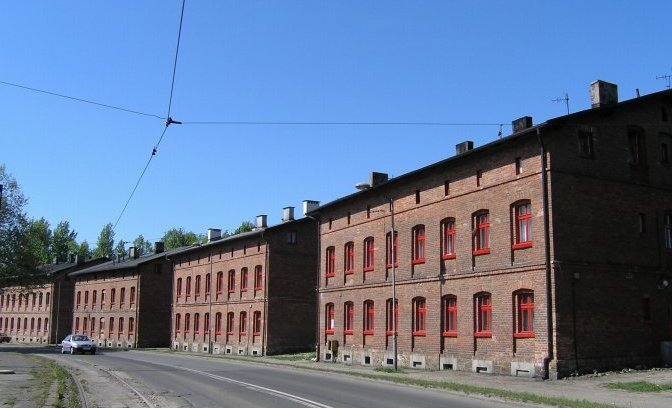
Familoks
