= Battle of Bobrek =

- Part of First Silesian Uprising
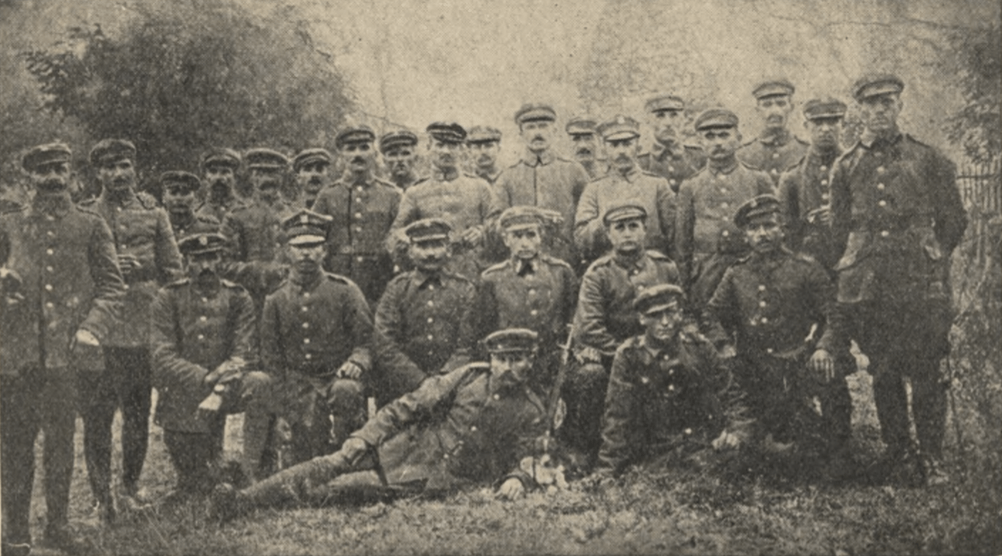
- Silesian insurgents under the command of Jan Trzęsiok in Bobrek.
Date	18 August 1919
Location	Bobrek (Near Beuthen), Germany
Result	German victory: Polish withdrawal; The Germans retain control over Bobrek

Belligerents
POW G.Śl.	Weimar Republic

Commanders and leaders
Jan Trzęsiok; Franciszek Siwek	

Units involved
Bobrek Insurgent Company Supported by: Schomberg Insurgent Company	Grenzschutz Ost Freikorps Tüllmann: 6th Company; Police; Industrial Guard

Strength
70 insurgents	270 soldiers; 12-15 HMGs and several armoured cars

Casualties and losses
7 killed	30 killed and several more wounded

The Battle of Bobrek was an engagement that occurred in the town of Bobrek during the First Silesian Uprising on 18 August 1919.

Insurgent forces under the command of Jan Trzęsiok captured the town of Bobrek, before declaring an establishment of a "Polish Republic". Ultimately however, insurgent forces had to withdraw from the town following a German counterattack.

== Prelude ==
On the night of 16 August, the First Silesian Uprising broke out in the Rybnik and Pleß districts. In response, the executive committee of the POW G.Śl. situated in Beuthen took the decision to commence the uprising in the Industrial District the following day.

=== Polish preparation ===
The insurgent network in Bobrek, commanded by Jan Trzęsiok, was among the most active in the Beuthen district. In total, Trzęsiok's insurgent company possessed 12 rifles, 20 pistols and 70 grenades.
The unit was directly subordinate to Adam Całka, the commander of the POW G.Śl. in Beuthen district, who, however, left Beuthen for Cracow on the 15th of August and Jan Lortz, the commander of insurgents in Roßberg, took command. Ultimately however, this was irrelevant as insurgents in the Industrial District struggled to establish effective communication lines.

Two weeks before the outbreak of the Uprising a German sailor by the name of Józef Termin arrived in Bobrek on vacation, with whom Jan Trzęsiok quickly made contact. Termin, being a Pole, decided to stay in Bobrek after Trzęsiok revealed the existence of the Polish Military Organization of Upper Silesia and plans of an armed uprising to him, despite a promotion awaiting him in the German Navy. A crucial issue for insurgent forces was a major lack of military experience, therefore Termin's service proved useful.

=== German preparation ===
The premature outbreak of the uprising in the Rybnik and Pleß districts had catastrophic results for insurgents in the Industrial District: with the Polish insurgents having lost the element of surprise and raising the awareness of the Grenzschutz Ost.

Opposing insurgent forces in Bobrek were two German companies: 270 men in total. The soldiers were stationed in 3 buildings between the Julia Steel Mill and the Gräfin Johanna Coal Mine. Apart from small arms, the soldiers in Bobrek possessed 12-15 machine guns and a large ammunition depot.

== Battle ==
The uprising in Bobrek broke out on schedule with the predetermined time set forth by the executive committee of the POW G.Śl. in Beuthen - at around 2:00 a.m.

=== Early military action ===
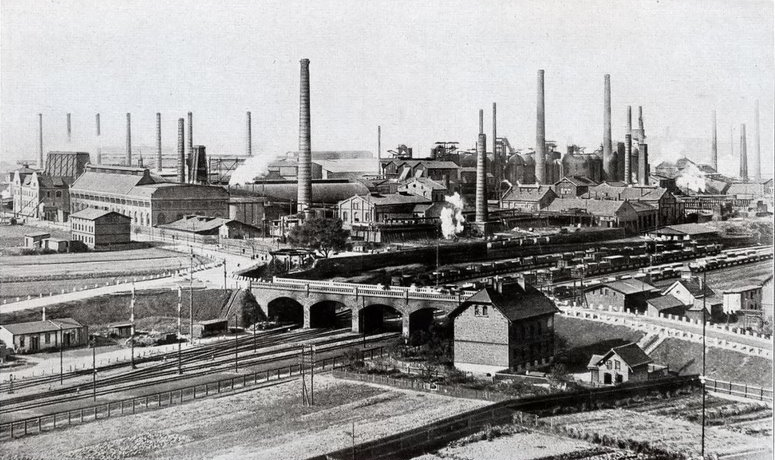
Julia Steel Mill in Bobrek

Trzęsiok began military action by capturing railway bridges in the direction of Karf, Schomberg and Rudahammer and fortifying them with groups of insurgents: issuing 2 rifles, 5 pistols, 15 grenades and ammunition to each of these groups. Thereafter, Trzęsiok, personally commanding 11 men, disarmed local police and gendarmerie before capturing the town hall where insurgents seized the officials' weapons. Subsequently, Trzęsiok seized the administrative building of the Julia Steel Mill and the steel mill where Trzęsiok and his men disarmed the industrial guard on the grounds of the plant.

A young 16-year-old insurgent, Barczak, reported to Trzęsiok next about a Grenzschutz weapon stash situated in the town prison. Trzęsiok immediately ordered an attack on the prison, which was seized after heavy fighting; 120 rifles and 10 crates of ammunition fell into insurgent hands, part of which was sent to insurgents fighting in the nearby town of Schomberg.

An insurgent attack on the town barracks was conducted from two directions: the Julia Steel Mill and the Gräfin Johanna Coal Mine, meanwhile Trzęsiok with 3 men took up position on top of an oil mill from where they supported advancing insurgents, pinning German machine gun positions. As the group of insurgents advancing from the Gräfin Johanna Coal Mine made its way to the barracks, its commander sent a young insurgent, Ryszard Imiołczyk, to throw in a grenade into the basement of the barracks. However, Imiołczyk was captured by German soldiers before being put up as a human shield facing the direction of the steel mill where he ultimately died.

In the meantime, insurgents in Schomberg attempted to send reinforcements to Trzęsiok but were stopped by German soldiers on the road to Bobrek.

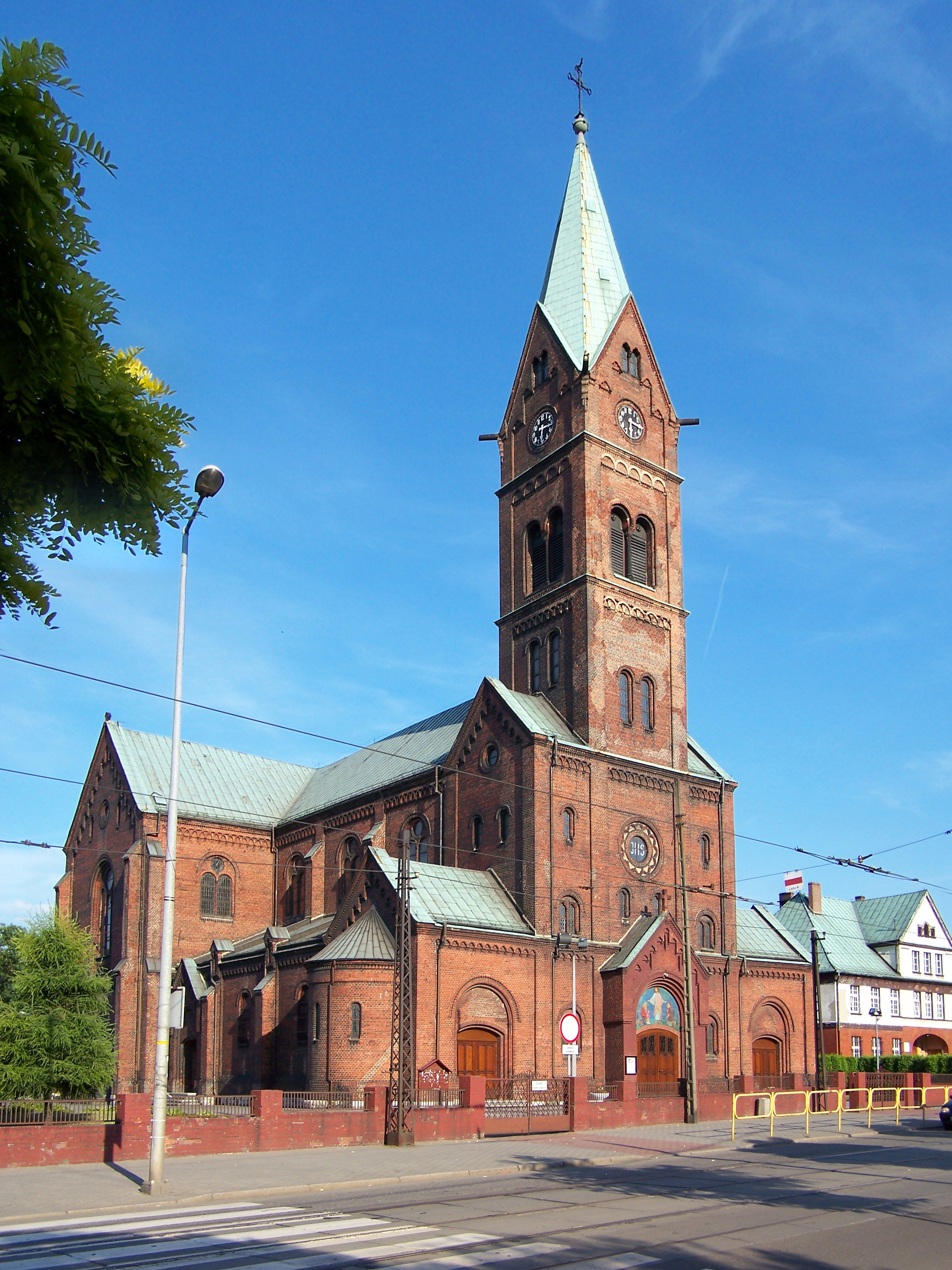
Church of the Holy Family in Bobrek.

=== German counterattack ===
Amidst the insurgents' attack on the barracks, Trzęsiok received reports that an enemy column of armoured cars was approaching from the direction of Rudahammer - although some sources claim the Germans sent in a tank.
As the German column approached the railway bridge, insurgents commanded by Józef Termin greeted it with rifle fire before the German soldiers dismounted and advanced forward attacking the enemy position.

Simultaneously, German reinforcements moved in from the direction of the Borsigwerk neighbourhood in present-day Zabrze. Ultimately, Termin and his bridge garrison had to withdraw to Bobrek after heavy fighting, where they took up position on top of the church tower in the town. After half an hour of fighting German reinforcements started arriving from Miechowitz and Karf in the north; Trzęsiok decided to withdraw from Bobrek to prevent his insurgent company's destruction, since promised insurgent reinforcements from Karf and Schomberg never arrived.

== Aftermath ==
The majority of Trzęsiok's company found shelter in refugee camps in Poland, however, Jan Trzęsiok, with 12 of his men, made his way to Schoppinitz where he continued fighting until the end of the uprising.

In the aftermath of the uprising, German servicemen and militia conducted retaliatory action, executing 12 insurgents in Bobrek.
