= Beuthen District =

Upper Silesian rural district

Beuthen Landkreis Beuthen
- Landkreis
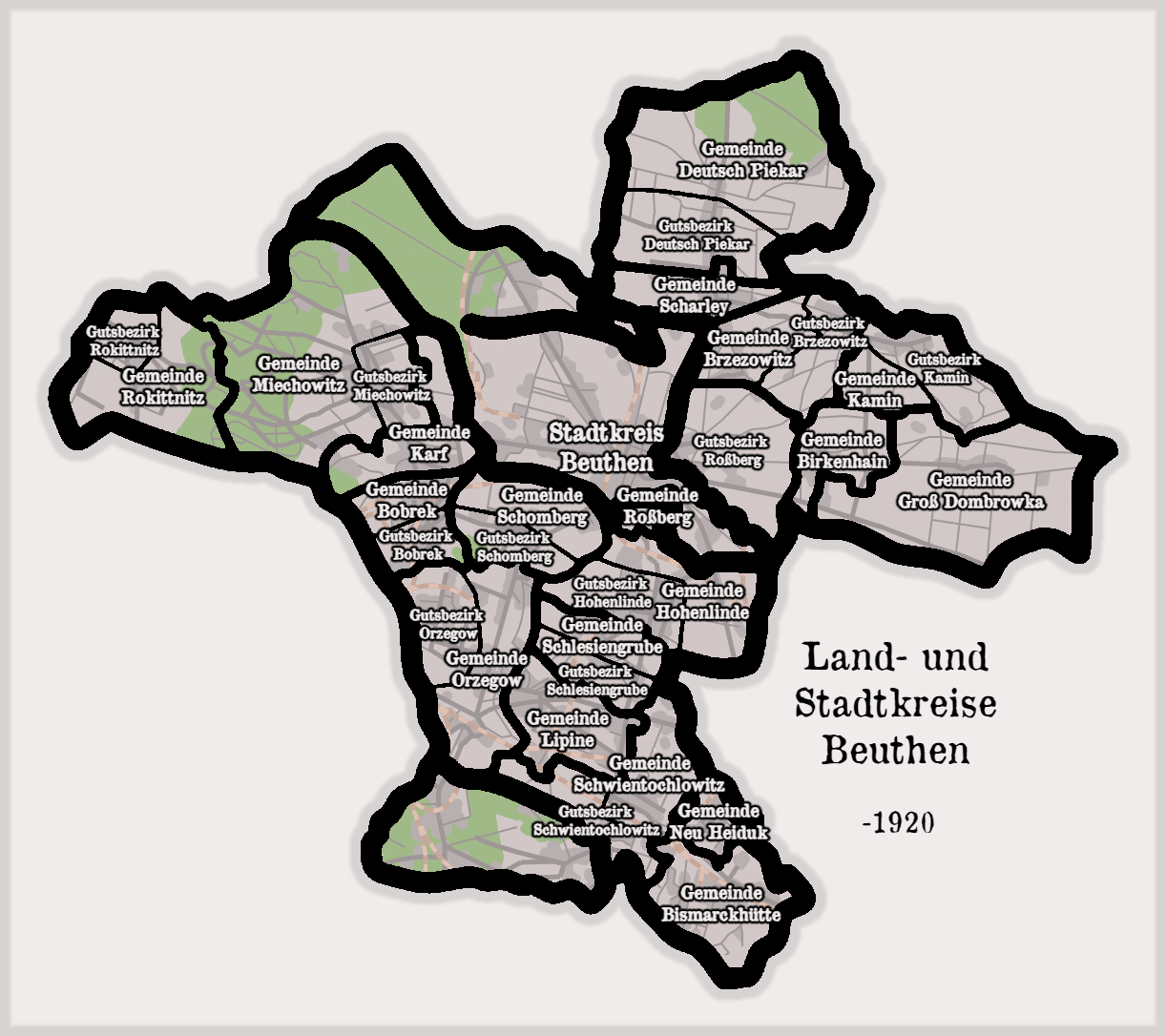
- Country: Prussia (1742-1871); German Empire (1871-1918); German Reich (1918-1927); Interallied Commission (1919-1922)
- Province: Silesia
- Seat: Beuthen (not part of the district from 1890)

Population (1910)
  - Total: 195,844

Beuthen District, or Beuthen Rural District (German: Landkreis Beuthen, Polish: Powiat ziemski Bytom) was an Upper Silesian rural district with its seat in Beuthen (Polish: Bytom), which itself was a separate district - an urban district (German: Stadtkreis Beuthen, Polish: Powiat miejski Bytom).

== History ==
In 1742 King Friedrich II of Prussia introduced Prussian administrative structures to the Silesia Province. Lands belonging to the Free State County of Bytom became a Prussian district - District of Beuthen (German: Kreis Beuthen).

In 1873 the Beuthen District was divided up: The Kattowitz, Tarnowitz and Zabrze districts were formed from parts of the district's land. In 1890 Beuthen became a stadtkreis (urban district), subsequently leaving the Beuthen District and on April 1, 1898 the town of Königshütte (Polish: Królewska Huta) split off from the Beuthen District to become its own district.

The German nationalist organization Hakata, soon after its establishment in Posen in 1890, began operation in Beuthen.

=== World War I ===
Although the outbreak of the Great War in 1914 was initially met with much enthusiasm across Germany, the local situation in Beuthen quickly turned for the worse. The Russian offensive in Galicia pushed the frontline nearer to Upper Silesia, prompting German authorities to instate mass mobilisation in Beuthen, which coupled with growing unemployment in the district resulted in a local shortage of materials. The strongly-industrialized Beuthen district heavily relied on the import of food items from the Polish borderland: a market which was shut off by the war.

As the looming threat of Russian invasion subsided, arms industry sprang up across the district, e.g. an explosive materials factory was raised on the grounds of the Hohenzollern Coal Mine in Schomberg. The military conscription of coal miners led to the employment of prisoners of war in Upper Silesia's coal mines; by 1915 POWs accounted for around 33% of workers in Beuthen-South coal mining district.

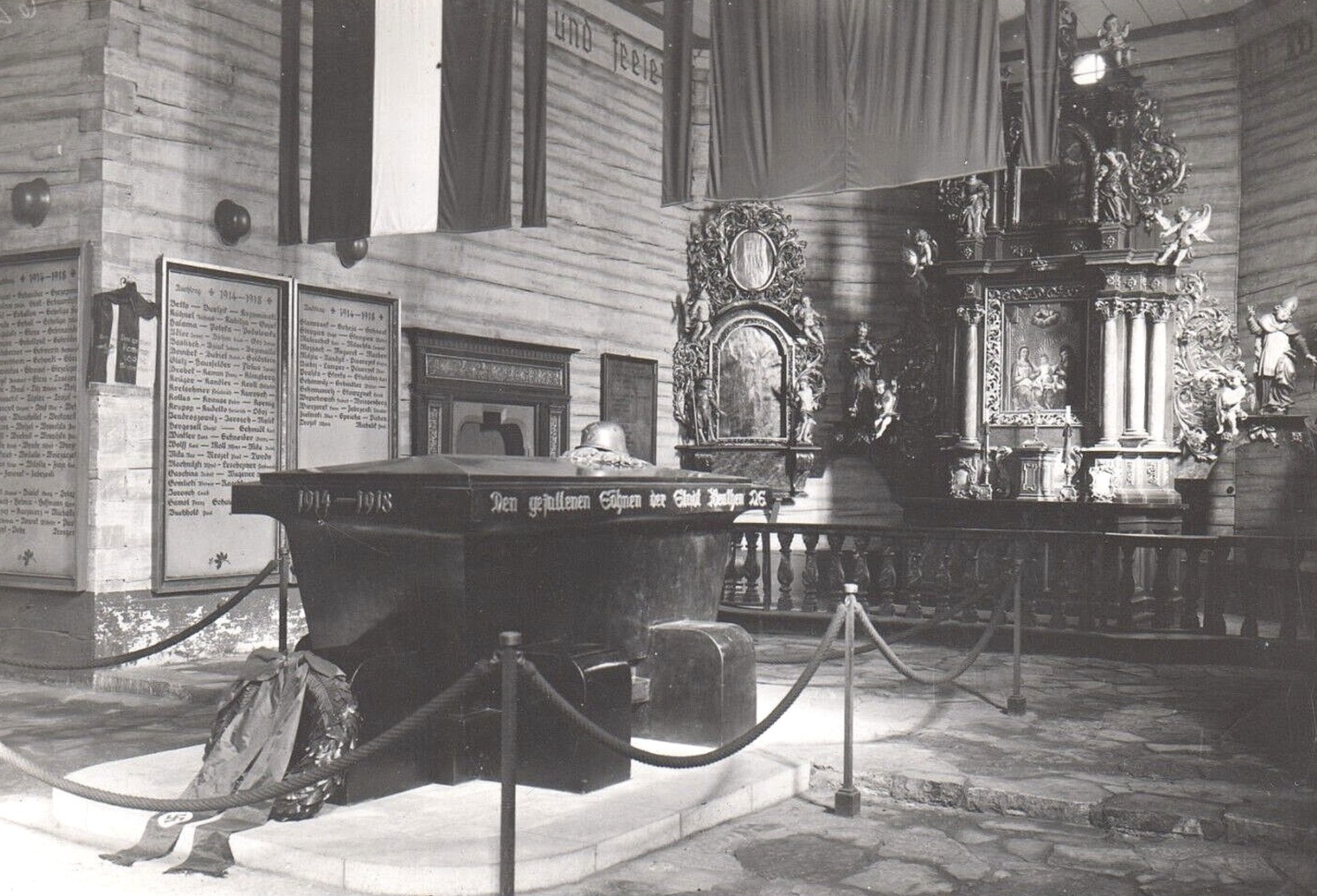
World War I memorial in the Schrotholz Church in Beuthen.

Gemeinde	Inhabitants fallen	% of male population (1910)
Number of fallen inhabitants per gemeinde in the war
Beuthen (Stadtkreis)	1533	4,5%
Bobrek	280 [circa]	5,9%
Karf	190	6,3%
Miechowitz	348	5,7%
Rokkitnitz	83	5,5%
Schomberg	158	5,4%

World War I Memorials in the Beuthen district
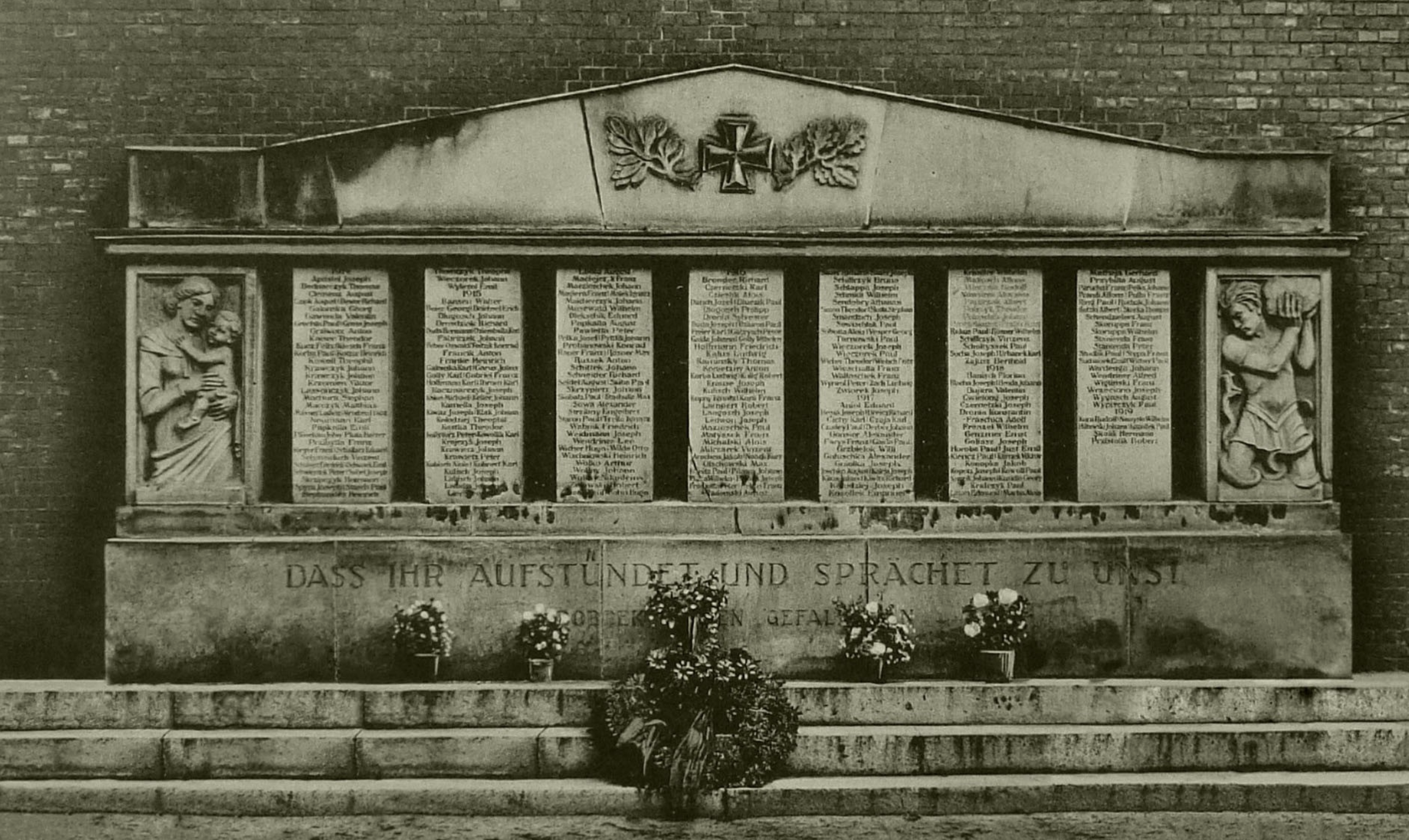
World War I memorial in Bobrek.

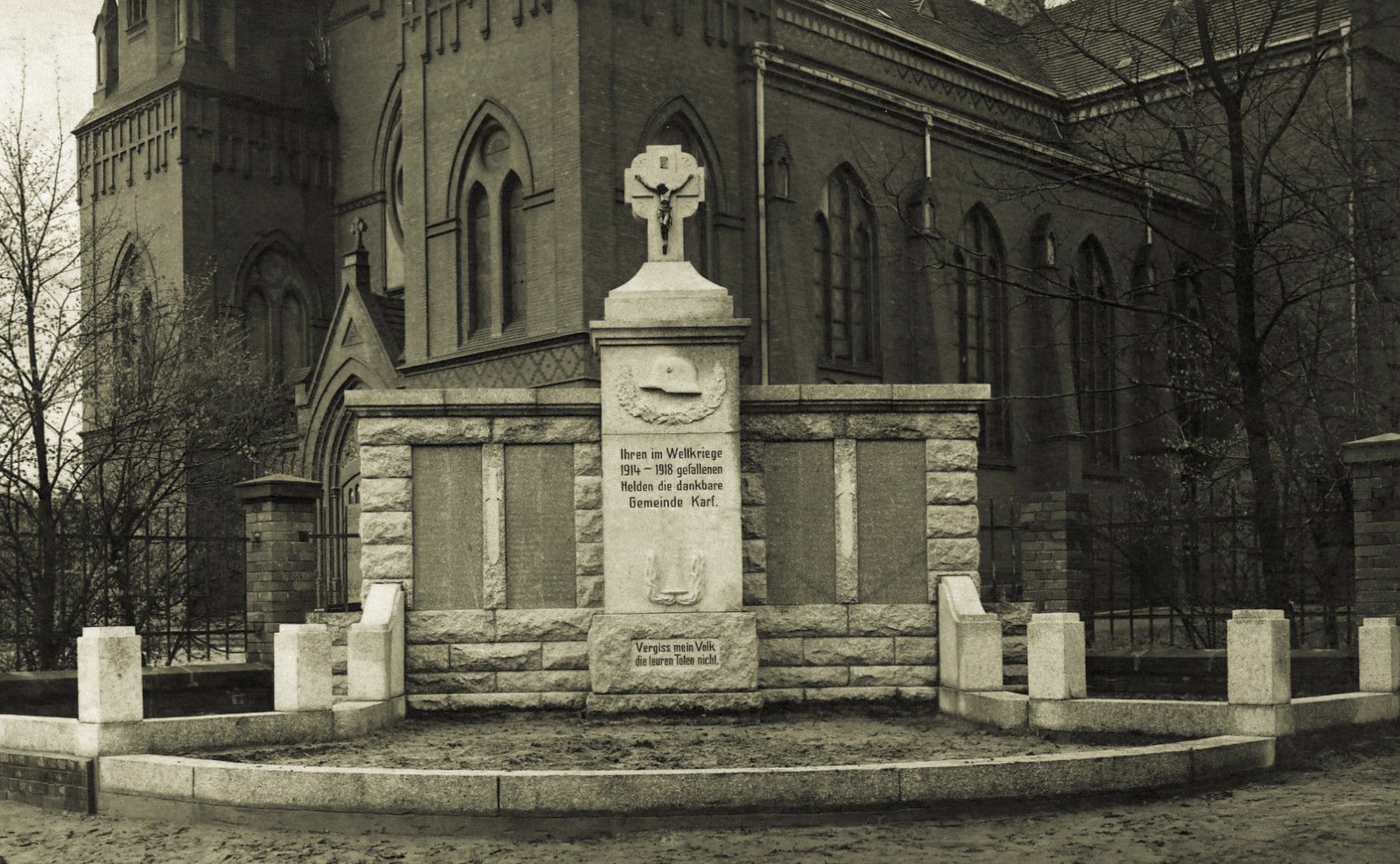
World War I memorial in Karf.

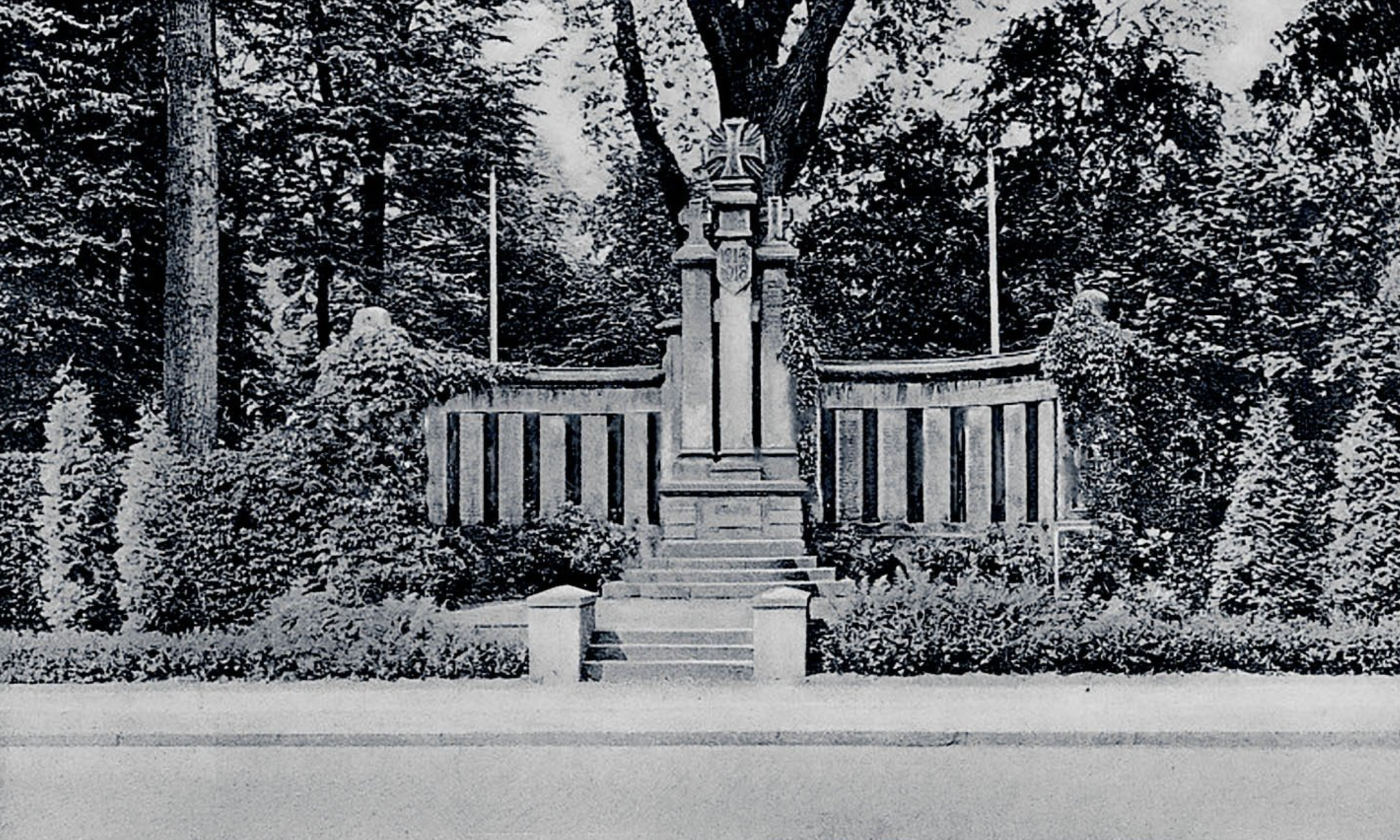
World War I memorial in Miechowitz.

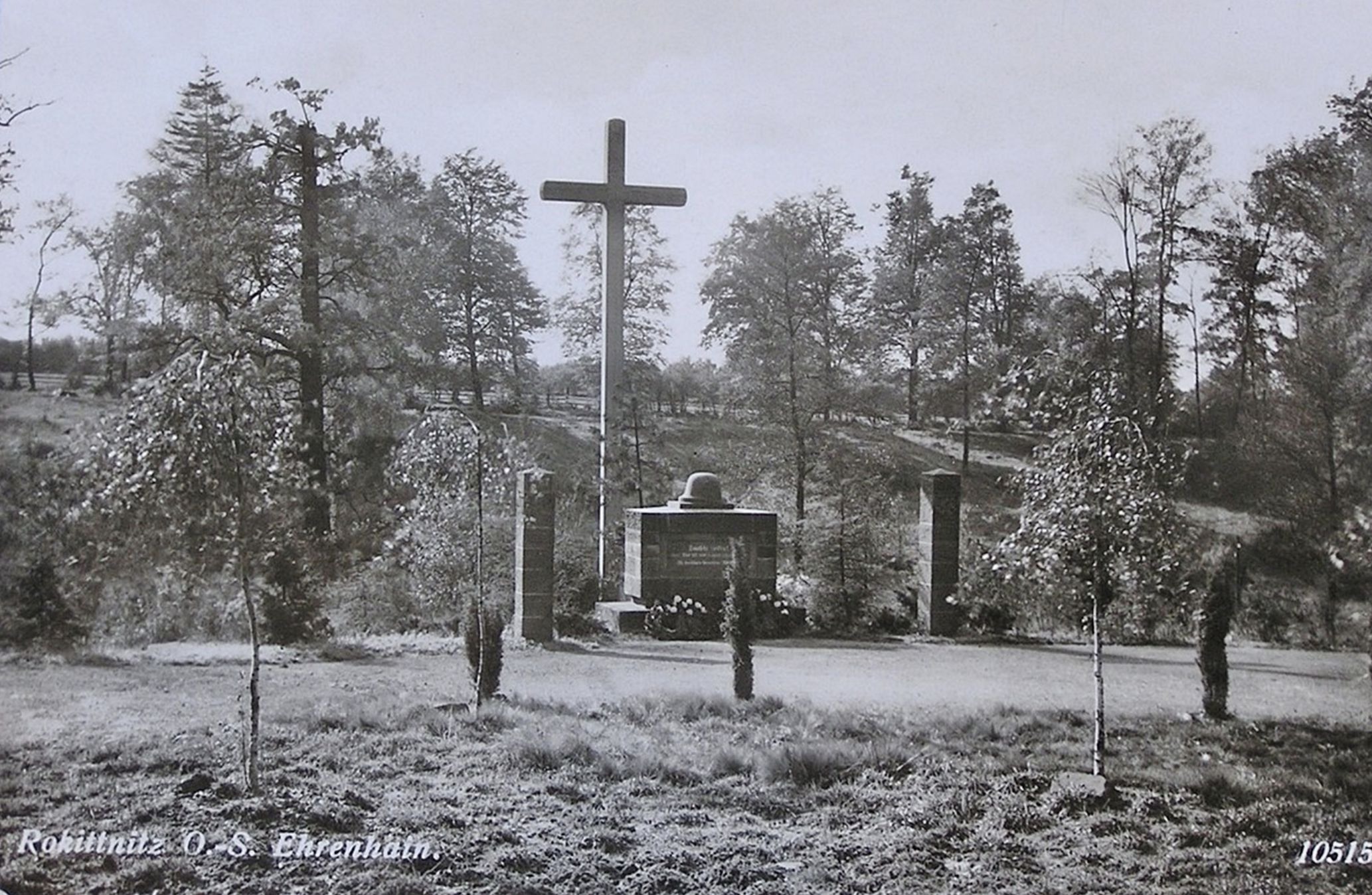
World War I memorial in Rokkitnitz.

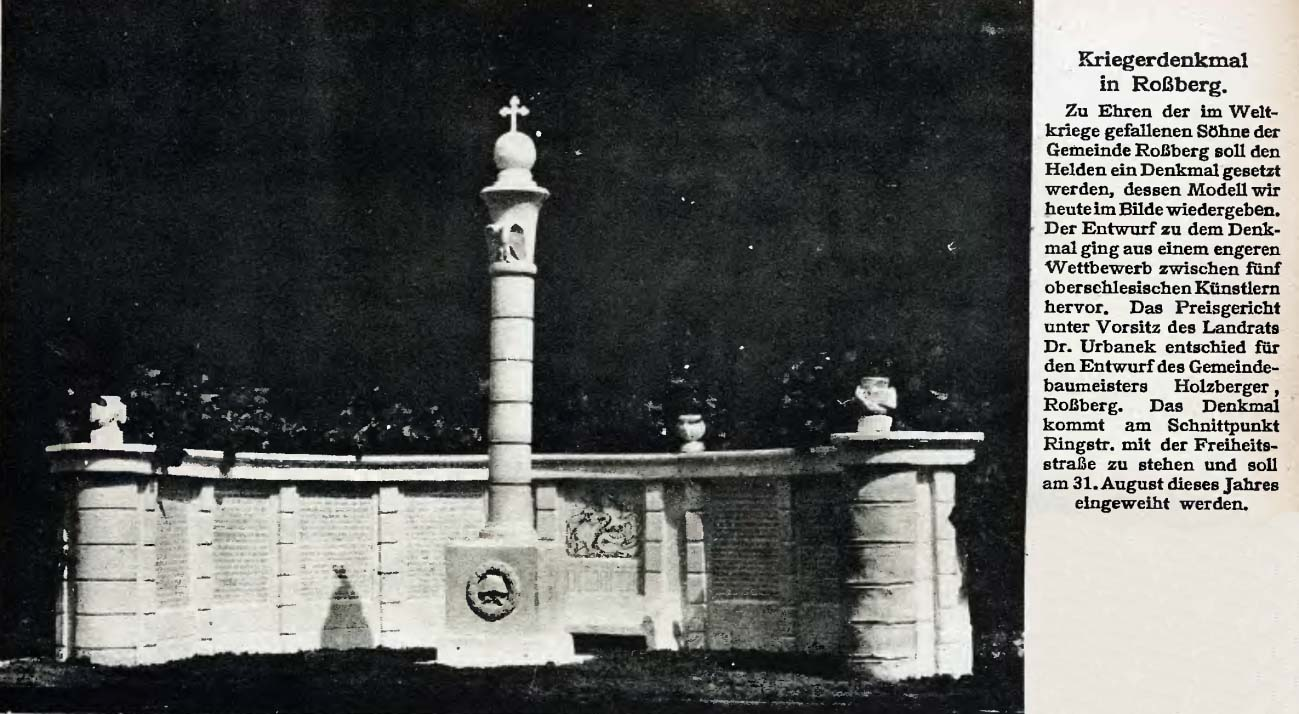
World War I memorial in Roßberg.

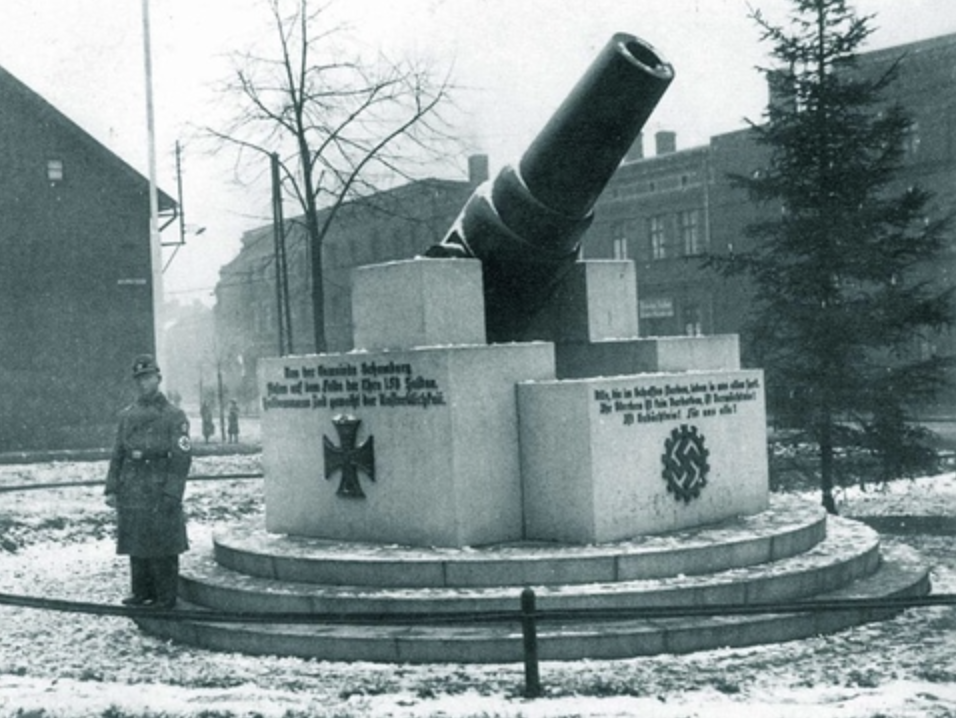
World War I & May Uprising memorial in Schomberg.

=== First Silesian Uprising ===
On the night of August 16, 1919 the First Silesian Uprising erupted when district commanders of the Polish Military Organization for the Rybnik and Pleß districts received orders to commence the uprising.
In response to news regarding the outbreak of the uprising, the Executive Committee of the POW G.Śl. situated in Beuthen issued orders to initiate the uprising in the Beuthen, Kattowitz, Hindenburg, Rybnik and Tarnowitz districts on the 18th of August at 2:00 a.m.

The commander of the POW G.Śl. in Beuthen district, Adam Całka, had left Beuthen for Kraków on the 15th of August without leave, consequently Jan Lortz the commander of POW G.Śl. in Roßberg assumed command.

==== Fighting in Beuthen ====
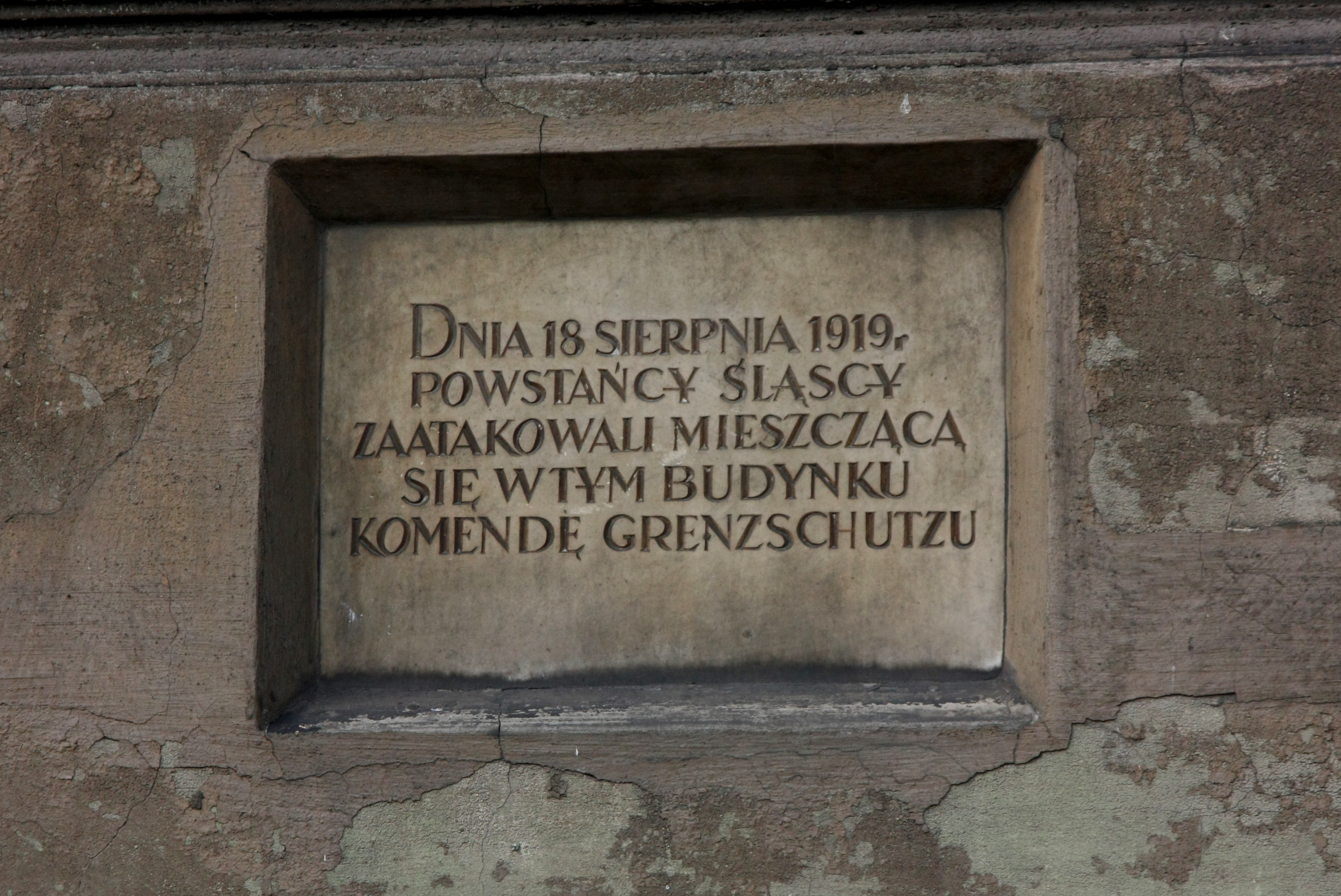
Inscription on the building of the former Skorch's Hotel commemorating the insurgent attack on August 18th.

Despite 260 members of the POW G.Śl. in the city of Beuthen having given military oath, only 60 rallied at the outbreak of the uprising. Insurgents in Beuthen, under the command of Jan Lortz, possessed 18 rifles and 25 pistols.
The city of Beuthen housed a sizeable garrison of Grenzschutz units, barring the capture of the city by insurgent forces. Nonetheless, insurgents carried out attacks on the city.

The towns of Deutsch Piekar and Scharley were captured on the 18th of August after insurgents disarmed a local force of policemen. Thereafter, the 150-men strong insurgent company from Deutsch Piekar under the command of Jan Lortz attacked the Barracks in Beuthen from the direction of Scharley. The attack was quickly repulsed by machine gun fire, forcing the insurgents to flee.
That same day, the towns of Deutsch Piekar and Scharley were recaptured by the Reichswehr, putting an end to the uprising in the northern part of the Beuthen district.

The town of Roßberg, directly adjacent to Beuthen's historic city centre, was captured by insurgent forces on the eve of the uprising, with the local police unit having fled the town. An insurgent unit under the command of Andrzej Demarczyk attacked Skorch's Hotel in Beuthen (Grenzschutz headquarters) from the direction of Roßberg. The attack was ultimately repulsed; A counterattack by men of the Freikorps Tüllmann recaptured the town after three days of fighting.

==== Fighting in Bobrek, Karf & Schomberg ====
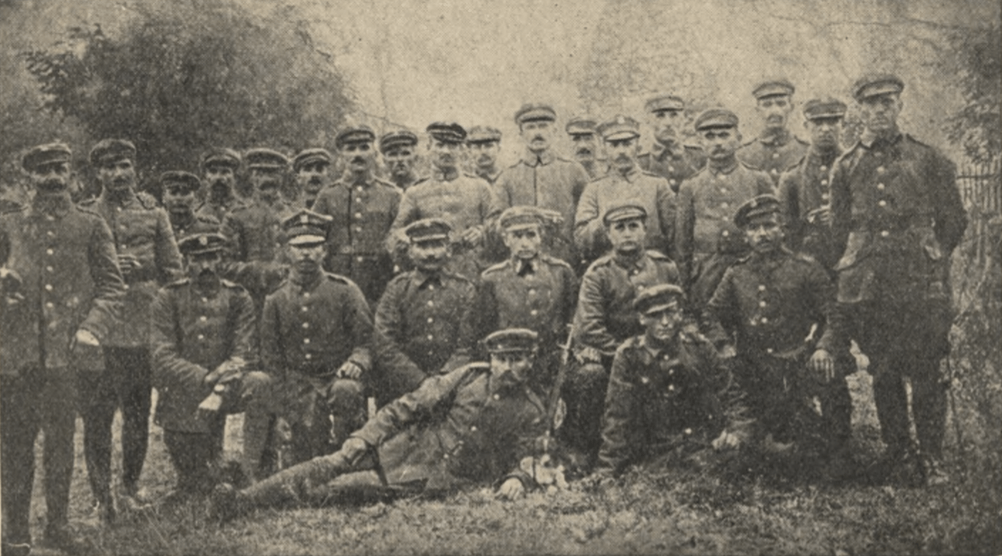
Silesian insurgents under the command of Jan Trzęsiok in Bobrek.

Insurgents forces in Bobrek commanded by Jan Trzęsiok numbered 70 men and possessed 12 rifles, 20 pistols and 70 grenades. Opposing the insurgent forces in Bobrek and Karf were two German companies.
In the early hours of August 18 insurgents in Bobrek disarmed units of German police, militia and industrial guard on the grounds of the Julia Steel Mill before attacking the town prison which was seized after heavy fighting; 120 rifles and 10 crates of ammunition fell into insurgent hands. Following the capture of Bobrek, the Silesian insurgents declared the establishment of a "Polish Republic".
Ultimately, insurgent forces in Bobrek were forced to retreat to Schoppinitz following a Grenzschutz counterattack. In total, 7 insurgents and 30 German servicemen lost their lives during the fighting in Bobrek.

In Karf, a group of 50 insurgents under the command of Jan Feja attacked a reconnaissance mission of Freikorps Tüllmann on the night of August 18 at around 2.a.m.

In Schomberg insurgents under the command of Adolf Piontek attacked the town hall. Although 80 members of the POW G.Śl. had given military oath in the town, only 46 rallied at the outbreak of the uprising, possessing 25 rifles, 12 pistols and 35 grenades. Opposing them were 250 men of the Freikorps Tüllmann.
The attack on the town hall was carried out in order to seize a German stash of weapons and ammunition, which ultimately could not be located. Additionally, two insurgents barged into Godulla's Palace in Schomberg, where they announced that "Haller's Army is coming".
Insurgent forces had to withdraw from Schomberg after an hour-long fight due to shortage of ammunition and incoming German reinforcements.

=== Plebiscite in Silesia ===
In the Upper Silesia Plebiscite the residents of the city of Beuthen voted by a majority of 74.7% to remain in Germany. However, in the Beuthen Rural District the Polish side received 59.1% of the vote.

Following the plebiscite, the Beuthen District was divided up between Germany and Poland. Poland received the southern and eastern parts of the district from which the Świętochłowice County (Polish: Powiat świętochłowicki) was created. The city of Beuthen (with the exception of Friedenshütte) remained with Germany.

== Demographics ==
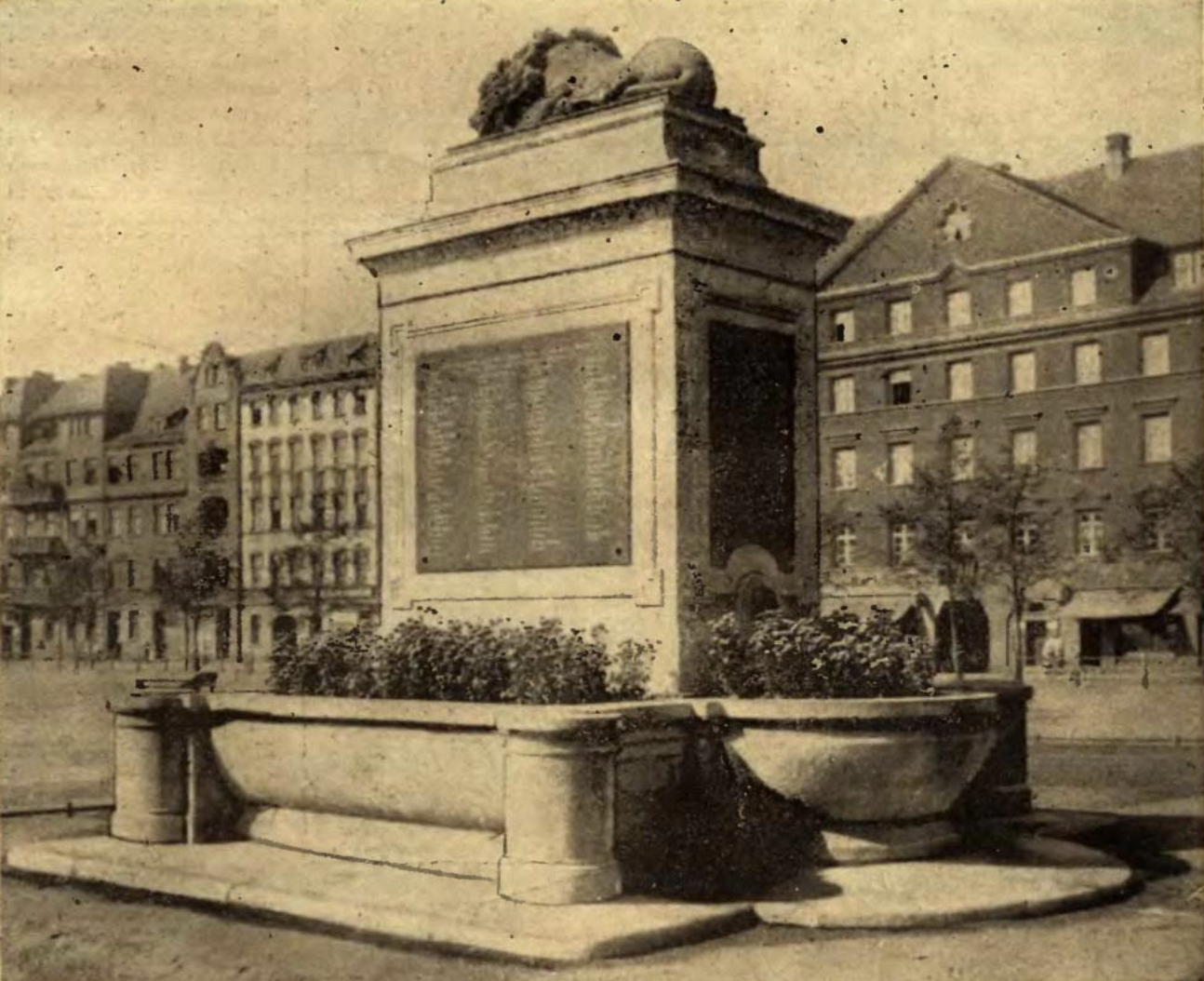
Sleeping Lion in Beuthen O.S. - commemorating fallen inhabitants of Beuthen District in the Franco-Prussian War.

Population of the District of Beuthen by year:

	1890	1900	1910
Stadtkreis	36,905	51,404	67,718
Landkreis	121,763	195,758	195,844

=== Ethnic composition ===
The table below presents the population structure of the Beuthen district prior to its division in 1873, according to the Prussian census information.

Population of Kreis Beuthen
	1852		1861		1867	
Germans	16,416	17.4%	31,903	21.9%	44,496	23.1%
Poles	77,857	82.6%	113,741	78.1%	147,894	76.9%
Total	94,273		145,644		192,390	

Furthermore, Beuthen had a considerable Jewish and Czech minority.

== Municipalities ==
Municipalities of the Beuthen District in 1910:

Gemeinde	Population (1910)	Powiat/City (2020)
Beuthen District
Stadtkreis Beuthen	67718	Bytom
Birkenhain	4804	Piekary Śląskie
Bismarckhütte	22687	Chorzów
Bobrek	8821	Bytom
Brzezowitz	2224	Piekary Śląskie
Deutsch Piekar	9733	Piekary Śląskie
Groß Dombrowka	3591	Piekary Śląskie
Hohenlinde	10853	Bytom
Karf	6083	Bytom
Kamin	1887	Piekary Śląskie
Lipine	18190	Świętochłowice
Miechowitz	12248	Bytom
Neu Heiduk	6240	Chorzów
Orzegow	14166	Ruda Śląska
Rokittnitz	2848	Zabrze
Roßberg	20435	Bytom
Scharley	11009	Piekary Śląskie
Schlesiengrube	10313	Świętochłowice
Schomberg	5999	Bytom
Schwientochlowitz	23640	Świętochłowice

== Sources ==
- Gemeindeverzeichnis Deutschland 1900 gemeindeverzeichnis.de. Retrieved October 27, 2020.
- Landkreis Beuthen-Tarnowitz www.territorial.de. Retrieved October 27, 2020.
- Wyniki plebiscytu na Górnym Śląsku. Dziewulski, Stefan. Warszawa 1922.
- Sprachliche Minderheiten im preussischen Staat. Belzyt, Leszek. Marburg 1998.
- https://www.bytom.pl/czas-wolny/listopad bytom.pl. Retrieved March 4, 2024.
