= Bobrek-Karf Municipality =

Municipality in Beuthen-Tarnowitz, Germany

Bobrek-Karf Gemeinde Bobrek-Karf, Gemeinde Bobrek
- Gemeinde
- Interactive map of Bobrek-Karf
- Country: German Reich (1928-1933); German Reich (1933-1945)
- Province: Silesia
- Rural District: Beuthen-Tarnowitz District
- Seat: Bobrek

Population (1939)
  - Total: 22,095

Gemeinde Bobrek-Karf, also referred to as simply Gemeinde Bobrek or Gemeinde Karf-Bobrek (Polish: Gmina Bobrek-Karb, Gmina Bobrek, Gmina Karb-Bobrek), was a municipality in the District of Beuthen-Tarnowitz, part of the Silesian Province of Germany. It was created following the unification of the Bobrek and Karf municipalities in 1928.

== History ==
The unification of the municipalities of Karf and Bobrek was proclaimed in 1928, the result was the creation of the Bobrek-Karf Municipality.

In 1932 a wooden evangelical church was built in Bobrek.

During the Second World War a volkssturm battalion was levied in Bobrek-Karf.

The municipality was abolished in 1945 following the Polish takeover of Bobrek and Karf, in its place a new municipality (Gmina Bobrek) was created (later renamed to "Gmina Bobrek-Karb").

== Demographics ==
Population of the municipality (Gemeinde) of Bobrek-Karf:

| | Population |
|---|---|
| Year | Number |
| 1933 | 21974 |
| 1939 | 22095 |

Religious beliefs in Bobrek-Karf:

| | Catholicism | Evangelicalism | Other Christian denominations | Judaism |
|---|---|---|---|---|
| 1933 | 20773 | 1057 | 4 | 40 |
| 1939 | 20845 | 1094 | 18 | 2 |

== Sources ==
- Deutsche Verwaltungsgeschichte Schlesien, Beuthen
- Gemeindeverzeichnis Landkreis Beuthen-Tarnowitz [Stand: 1. 1. 1945]
- Data
