= Oppeln (region) =

Region of Silesia, Prussia

Regierungsbezirk Liegnitz Regierungsbezirk Breslau Regierungsbezirk Oppeln

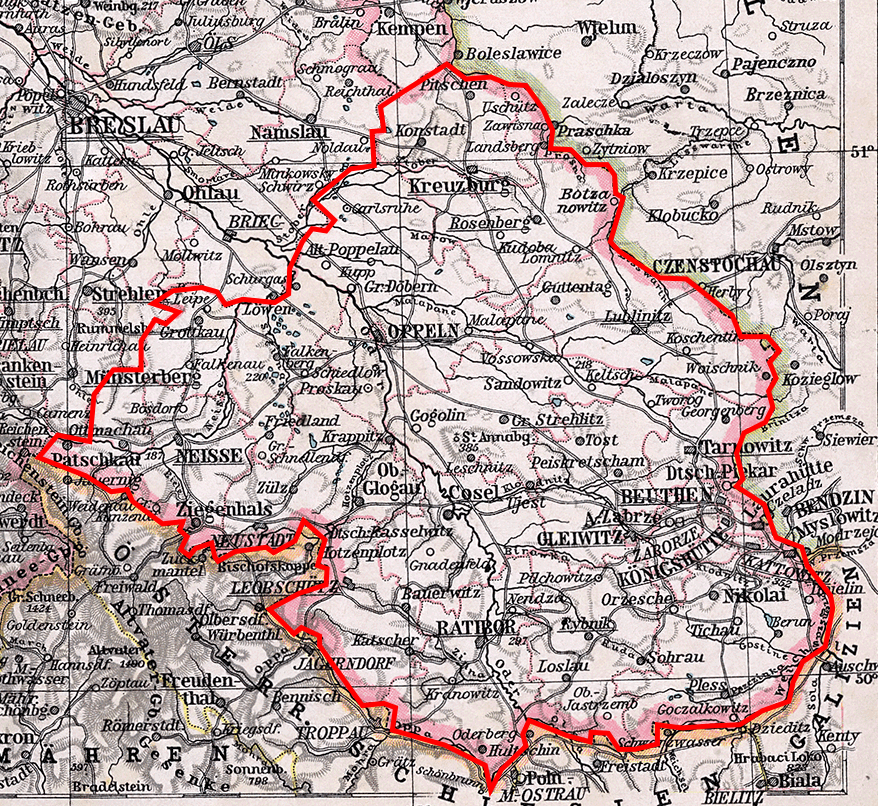
Regierungsbezirk Oppeln in Silesia, 1905

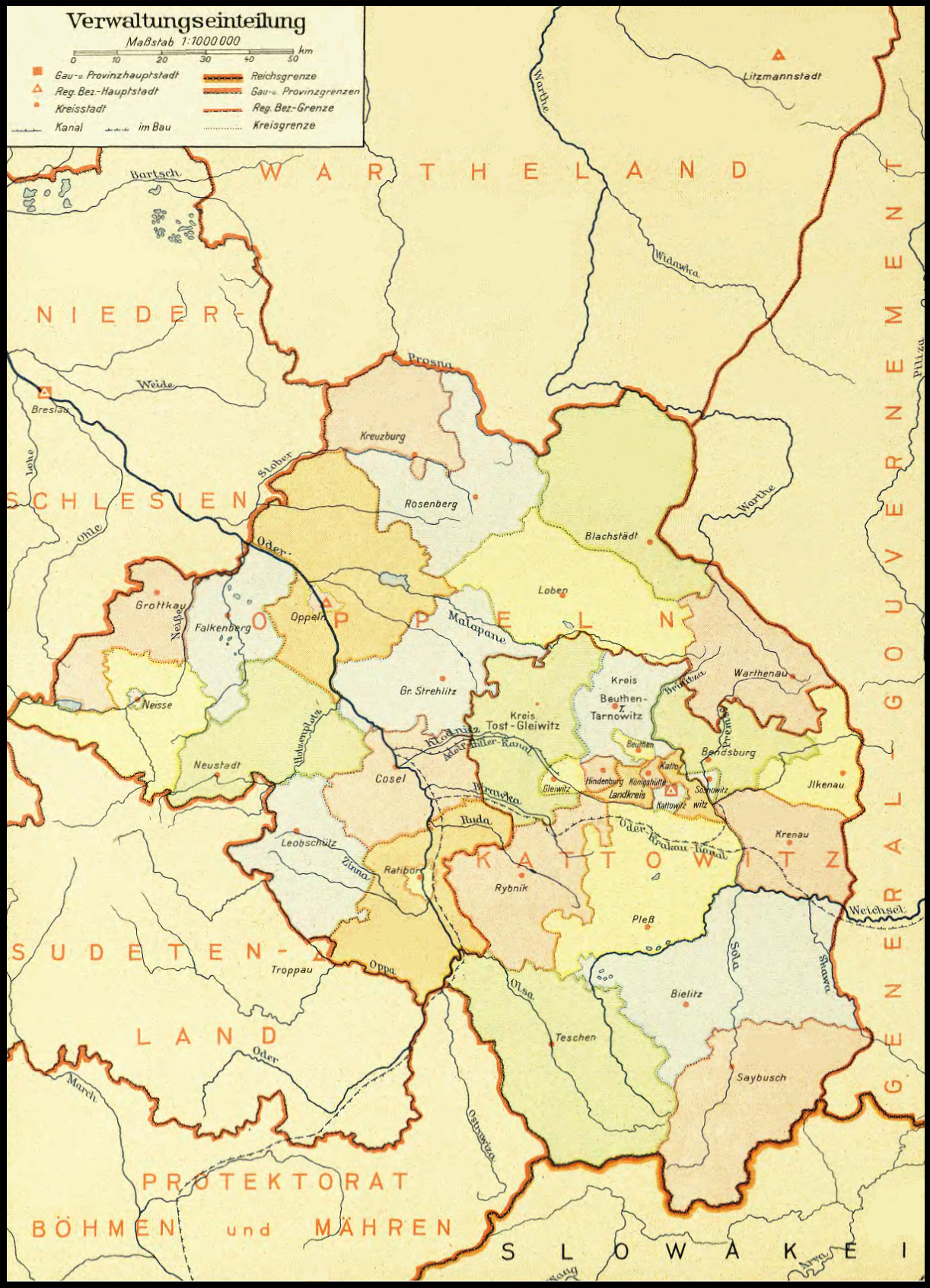
Districts in Gau Upper Silesia (1943)

Regierungsbezirk Oppeln was a Regierungsbezirk, or government region, in the Prussian Province of Silesia, from 1813 to 1945, which covered the south-eastern part of Silesia.

== Geography ==
The capital of the Regierungsbezirk was the Upper Silesian city of Oppeln. Other important cities in the region included Kattowitz, Gleiwitz, Beuthen, Königshütte, Hindenburg, Ratibor, Neustadt, Neisse and Kreuzburg.

It comprised the following districts (as of 1910):

Urban districts

1. Beuthen
2. Gleiwitz
3. Kattowitz
4. Königshütte
5. Oppeln
6. Ratibor (since 1904)

Rural districts

1. Kreis Beuthen
2. Kreis Cosel
3. Kreis Falkenberg
4. Kreis Groß Strehlitz
5. Kreis Grottkau
6. Kreis Zabrze (from 1915 "Hindenburg O. S.")
7. Kreis Kattowitz
8. Kreis Kreuzburg
9. Kreis Leobschütz
10. Kreis Lublinitz
11. Kreis Neiße
12. Kreis Neustadt
13. Kreis Oppeln
14. Kreis Pleß
15. Kreis Ratibor
16. Kreis Rosenberg
17. Kreis Rybnik
18. Kreis Tarnowitz
19. Kreis Tost-Gleiwitz

== Population ==
=== Ethno-linguistic structure ===
Number of Polish and German speakers in Regierungsbezirk Oppeln
Year	Polish		German		Other (including bilingual)	
Year	Number	Percentage	Number	Percentage	Number	Percentage
1819	377,100	67.2%	162,600	29.0%	21,503	3.8%
1828	418,437	61.1%	255,483	37.3%	10,904	1.6%
1831	456,348	62.0%	257,852	36.1%	13,254	1.9%
1834	468,691	62.6%	266,399	35.6%	13,120	1.8%
1837	495,362	62.1%	290,168	36.3%	12,679	1.6%
1840	525,395	58.6%	330,099	36.8%	41,570	4.6%
1843	540,402	58.1%	348,094	37.4%	42,292	4.5%
1846	568,582	58.1%	364,175	37.2%	45,736	4.7%
1852	584,293	58.6%	363,990	36.5%	49,445	4.9%
1855	590,248	58.7%	366,562	36.5%	48,270	4.8%
1858	612,849	57.3%	406,950	38.1%	49,037	4.6%
1861	665,865	59.1%	409,218	38.3%	51,187	4.6%
1867	742,153	59.8%	457,545	36.8%	41,611	3.4%
1890	918,728	58.2%	566,523	35.9%	92,480	5.9%
1900	1,048,230	56.1%	684,397	36.6%	135,519	7.3%
1905	1,158,805	56.9%	757,200	37.2%	117,651	5.8%
1910	1,169,340	53.0%	884,045	40.0%	154,596	7.0%

Ethnolinguistic structure of the districts in Regierungsbezirk Oppeln (1910)
District	Population	Polish	%	German	%	Bilingual	%	Czech	%
Landkreis Beuthen	195,844	123,016	62.8%	59,308	30.3%	11,695	6.0%	94	0.0%
Stadtkreis Beuthen	67,718	22,401	33.1%	41,071	60.7%	3,504	5.2%	55	0.1%
Falkenberg	37,526	3,815	10.2%	33,286	88.7%	365	1.0%	1	0.0%
Stadtkreis Gleiwitz	66,981	9,843	14.7%	49,543	74.0%	7,461	11.1%	46	0.1%
Groß Strehlitz	73,383	58,102	79.2%	12,616	17.2%	1,783	2.4%	870	1.2%
Grottkau	40,610	825	2.0%	39,589	97.5%	129	0.3%	26	0.1%
Landkreis Kattowitz	216,807	140,592	64.8%	65,763	30.3%	7,430	3.4%	98	0.0%
Stadtkreis Kattowitz	43,173	5,766	13.4%	36,891	85.4%	365	0.8%	13	0.0%
Stadtkreis Königshütte	72,641	24,687	34.0%	39,276	54.1%	8,366	11.5%	26	0.0%
Kosel	75,673	56,794	75.1%	16,433	21.7%	2,303	3.0%	90	0.1%
Kreuzburg	51,906	24,487	47.2%	24,363	46.9%	3,002	5.8%	10	0.0%
Leobschütz	82,635	5,178	6.3%	69,901	84.6%	1,200	1.5%	6,311	7.6%
Lublinitz	50,388	39,969	79.3%	7,384	14.7%	2,885	5.7%	138	0.3%
Neisse	101,223	1,752	1.7%	98,860	97.7%	380	0.4%	95	0.1%
Neustadt	97,537	43,787	44.9%	51,489	52.8%	2,182	2.2%	63	0.1%
Landkreis Oppeln	117,906	89,323	75.8%	23,740	20.1%	2,955	2.5%	1,852	1.6%
Stadtkreis Oppeln	33,907	5,371	15.8%	27,128	80.0%	1,385	4.1%	6	0.0%
Pleß	122,897	105,744	86.0%	16,464	13.4%	447	0.4%	24	0.0%
Landkreis Ratibor	118,923	56,765	47.7%	13,316	11.2%	1,576	1.3%	47,209	39.7%
Stadtkreis Ratibor	38,424	11,525	30.0%	22,914	59.6%	3,684	9.6%	247	0.6%
Rosenberg	52,341	42,234	80.7%	8,586	16.4%	1,514	2.9%	2	0.0%
Rybnik	131,630	102,430	77.8%	24,872	18.9%	3,636	2.8%	24	0.0%
Tarnowitz	77,583	51,858	66.8%	20,969	27.0%	4,742	6.1%	3	0.0%
Tost-Gleiwitz	80,515	61,509	76.4%	16,408	20.4%	2,535	3.1%	0	0.0%
Zabrze	159,810	81,567	51.0%	63,875	40.0%	13,973	8.7%	44	0.0%
Total	2,207,981	1,169,340	53.0%	884,045	40.0%	89,497	4.1%	57,347	2.6%
