= Freikorps Tüllmann =

Volunteer military force (Freikorps) in Germany from 1919 to 1920

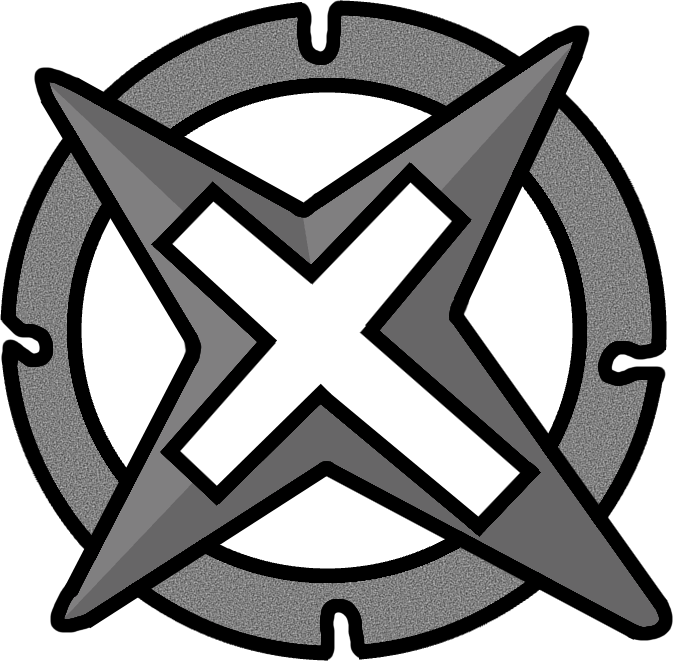
- Badge worn on the collars of soldiers of the unit Freikorps Tüllmann
- Active: 1919 - 1920
- Country: Germany
- Allegiance: Reichswehr
- Type: Freikorps
- Engagements: Silesian Uprisings; Battle of Bobrek

Freikorps Tüllmann, also called Detachment Tüllmann or Freiwilligen-Regiment Tüllmann, was a Freikorps paramilitary unit of the Weimar Republic that fought in the Silesian Uprisings where it engaged Silesian insurgents at the Battle of Bobrek. Following the Silesian Uprisings, Freikorps Tüllmann was re-designated as the fourth battalion of Infanterie-Regiment 110 and was absorbed into the Reichswehr. The unit was named after its commander, Hauptmann Tüllmann.

== Formation ==
Freikorps Tüllmann was raised and trained at Munsterlager in March of 1919 and consisted of two infantry battalions, four artillery batteries, and a cavalry detachment made up of elements from the 12th (Thuringian) Hussars. At the time the majority of the Freikorps of Upper Silesia were under the overall control of the IV Corps headquartered at Wrocław. Freikorps Tüllmann was originally assigned to the Pomeranian Border Guard as a part of the broader Grenzschutz Ost from April to May of 1919 and assisted in the capture of Stettin. The unit was later transferred to Silesia on May 30, 1919 and joined the 117th Infantry Division where it was then assigned to Reichswehr-Brigade 10.

== Deployments ==
Freikorps Tüllmann assisted other Freikorps units in eastern Germany in suppressing the First Silesian uprising and participated in the Battle of Bobrek. The unit fought in the uprising alongside Marinebrigade Ehrhardt, Marine-Brigade von Loewenfeld, Freikorps Dohna, and Freikorps Hessische-Thüringische-Weladekischen, the roughly 14,000-man army was under the overall command of General Karl Höfer. Following the uprisings in Upper Silesia in January 1920, the detachment was incorporated into the Reichswehr. For example, the 12th Hussar detachment of Freikorps Tüllmann became part of the 16th Reichswehr Cavalry Regiment.

== Notable people ==
- Luftwaffe Generalmajor Leopold Heydenrich

== See also ==
- Freikorps Epp
- Freikorps Oberland
- Freikorps in the Baltic
- Freikorps Roßbach
- Freikorps Werdenfels
