= Freikorps Epp =

German Freikorps unit (1919–1920)

Freikorps Epp Bayerisches Schützenkorps
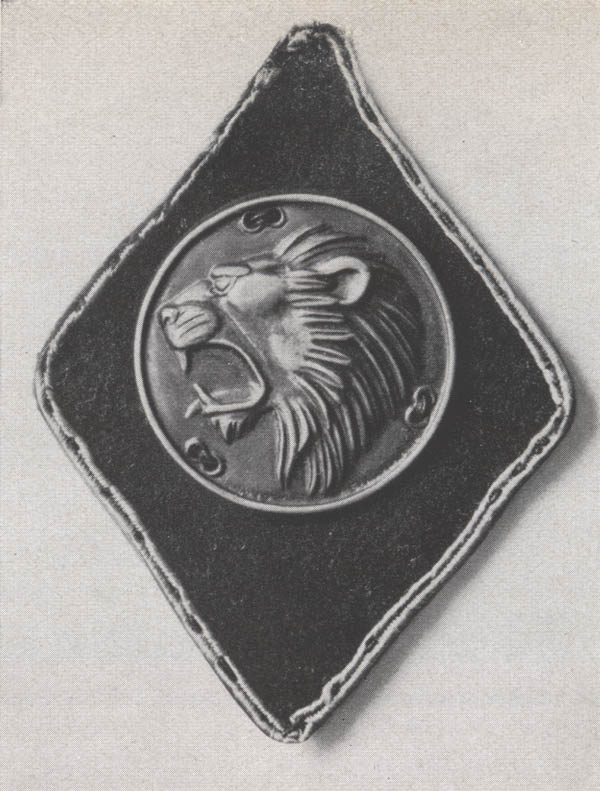
- Lozenge sleeve insignia of Freikorps Epp
- Active: February 1919 – March 1920
- Country: Germany
- Allegiance: Weimar Republic
- Branch: Reichswehr
- Type: Freikorps
- Role: Urban warfare
- Size: 700–1,000
- Engagements: German Revolution of 1918–1919; Bavarian Soviet Republic; Kapp Putsch; Ruhr Uprising

Commanders
- Commander: Franz Ritter von Epp

Freikorps Epp or Freikorps Ritter von Epp, also called the Bayerisches Schützenkorps (English: Bavarian Rifle Corps), was a paramilitary Freikorps of the Weimar Republic, which was raised in February 1919 by Franz Ritter von Epp to suppress the Bavarian Soviet Republic following the German revolution of 1918–1919. The unit was absorbed into the Reichswehr, the armed forces of the republic, and was later used to suppress the Ruhr Red Army during the Ruhr uprising. Notable members of the unit included Ernst Röhm, Rudolf Hess, Eduard Dietl, Hans Frank, Gregor Strasser and Otto Strasser.

== History ==
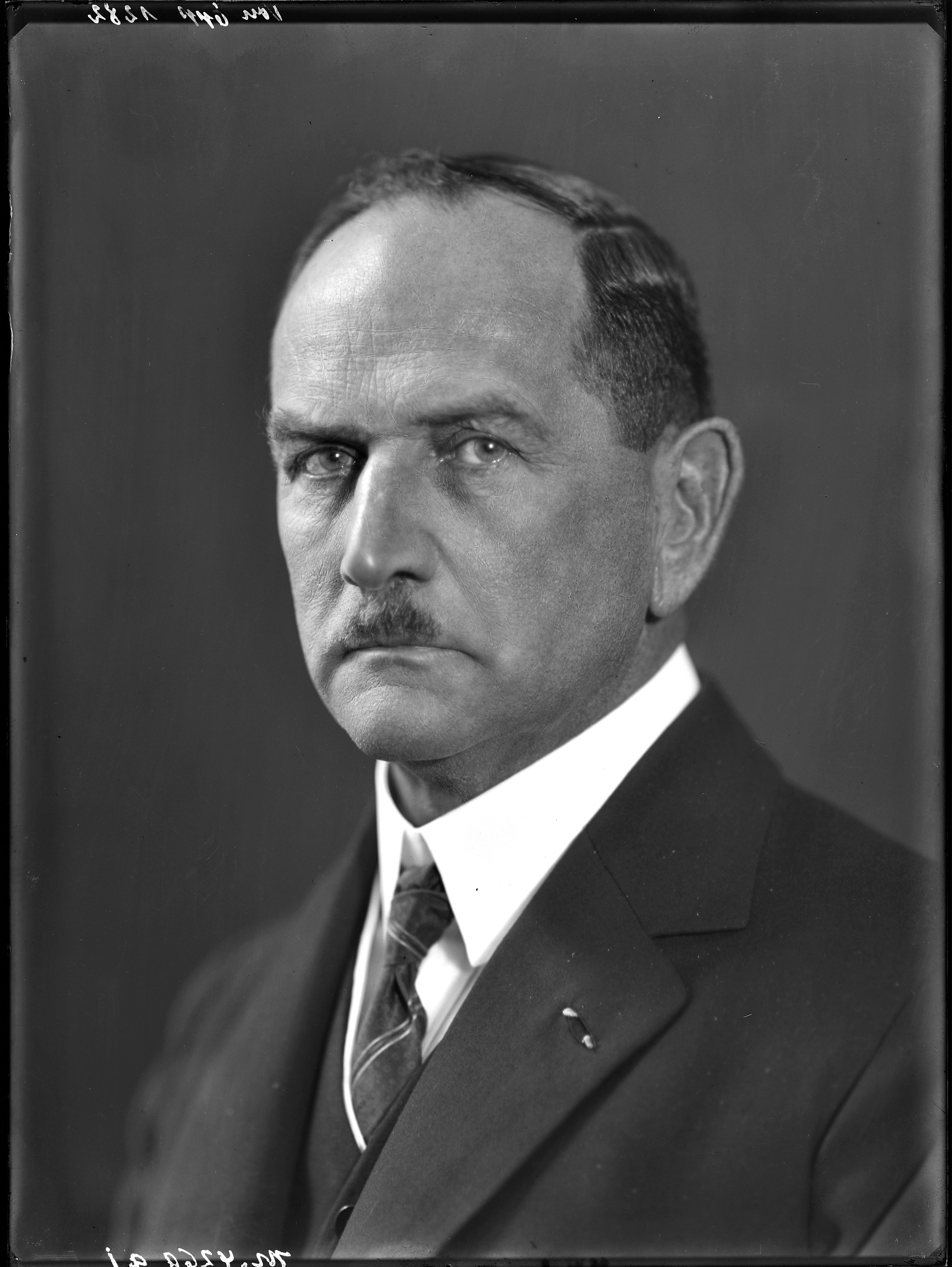
Franz Xaver Ritter von Epp, the Freikorp's original commander from 1919 to 1920

Franz Ritter von Epp was a career officer of the Imperial German Army who fought in the Herero Wars, the Boxer Rebellion, and World War I. Epp was awarded the Military Order of Max Joseph for heroism displayed in 1916 and was ennobled with the title of Ritter by Wilhelm, German Crown Prince. By 1918, Epp was promoted to the rank of Oberst and commanded the Royal Bavarian Life Guards.

Following the 1918 Armistice, the German Empire was dissolved after the declaration of the Weimar Republic which plunged much of Germany into the German revolution of 1918–1919. During this time, many Freikorps were created to suppress the numerous revolutionary outbreaks, which included the Spartacist uprising and the Bavarian Soviet Republic among others. Freikorps were a way for the new republic to establish and maintain order during its early years. They also demonstrated the ineptitude of the provisional Reichswehr and its inability to maintain law and order.

== Organization ==
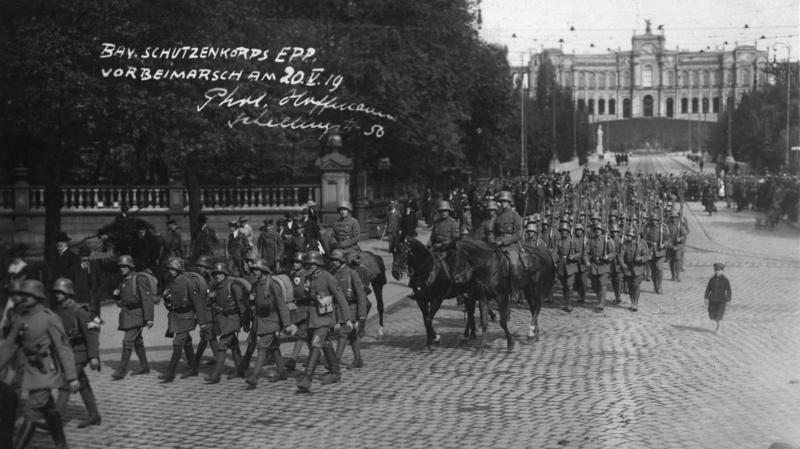
Parade of the Bavarian Rifle Corps Epp, 20 May 1919 (photo by Heinrich Hoffmann)

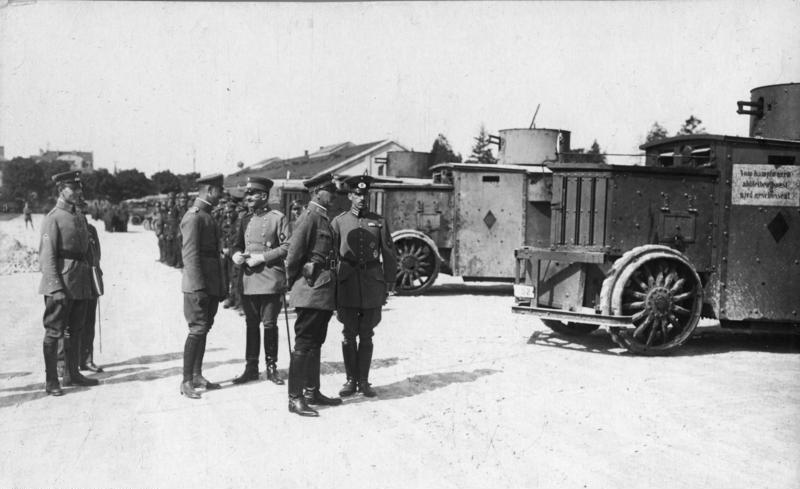
Franz von Epp visiting the motor vehicle detachment (Panzerwagen-Abteliung) of Freikorps Epp, 1919

Freikorps Epp was founded in February 1919 at Ohrdruf in Freistaat Sachsen-Gotha (today, part of Thuringia) at the behest of Gustav Noske, the soon-to-be Reichsminister of Defense, in order to suppress the Bavarian Soviet Republic. Freikorps Epp was organized between February and April 1919. On March 31, 1919 Epp had only 49 officers, 33 non-commissioned officers and 94 enlisted men, however, by April 23, 1919 this had increased to approximately 700 men. It was headquartered in Ulm as the Bavarian Rifle Corps (German: Bayerisches Schützenkorps). Freikorps Epp was organized in the spring of 1919 as follows:

- Bayerisches Schützen Regiment 1 (infantry)
- Bayerisches Schützen Regiment 2 (infantry)
- Jäger-Battalion Bayerisches Schützenkorps (Jäger light infantry, formerly part of Freikorps Chiemgau).
- Reiter-Regiment Bayerisches Schützenkorps (cavalry)
- Leichtes Artillerie-Regiment Bayerisches Schützenkorps (light artillery)
- Schweres Artillerie-Regiment Bayerisches Schützenkorps (heavy artillery)
- Freiwilligen-Flieger-Abteilung Deßloch (flying squadron), under Otto Deßloch
- Panzerwagen-Abteliung (armored car detachment, with several Daimler KD-1 and Lancia 1ZM vehicles)

== Suppression of the Bavarian Soviet Republic ==
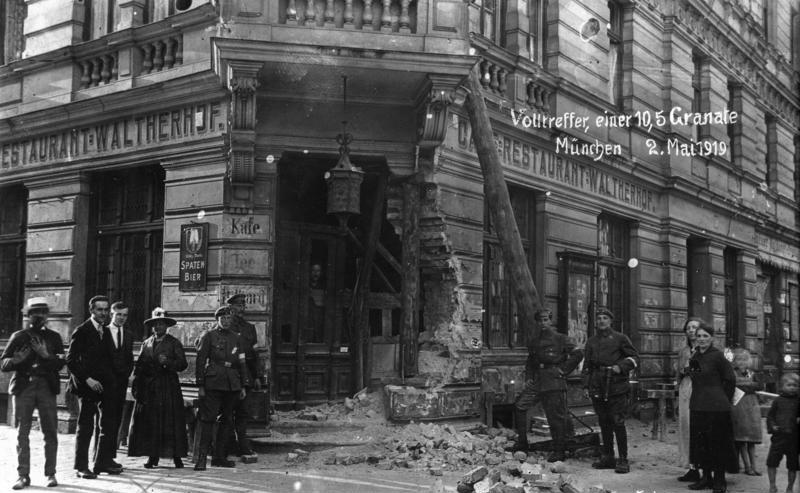
A corner building on Waltherstraße in Munich, severely damaged by grenades and artillery, 2 May 1919

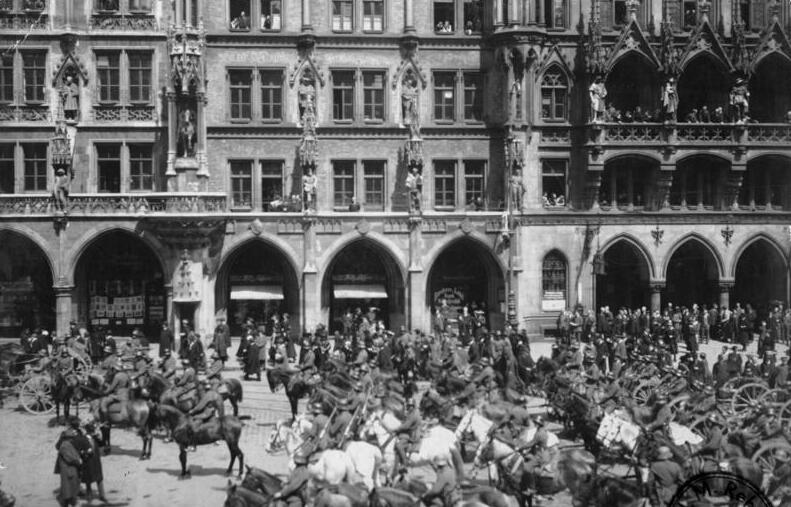
Epp and Freikorps troops entering the Marienplatz, May 4, 1919

On April 27, 1919 Freikorps Epp, along with the Freikorps Görlitz, Freikorps Lützow, Freikorps Werdenfels, Marinebrigade Ehrhardt, Freikorps Oberland, the Württembergische Sicherheitstruppen (Württemberg Security Forces) under the command of Erwin Rommel, and several Württemberg military units were deployed to the Bavarian Soviet Republic to attack Munich. The government troops had a total strength of approximately 20,000 men. On April 28, 1919 Freikorps Epp quickly occupied the cities of Freising, Erding, Wasserburg am Inn, and Gars am Inn. By May 1, Munich was encircled by the combined Freikorps and Reichswehr forces. The next day, Munich was completely occupied by both Freikorps and Weimar government forces.

During the fighting, it is estimated that Epp's Freikorps killed upward of 600 "communists" and "Spartacists", although many of these were likely civilians. During the occupation of Munich, Freikorps Epp was held responsible for the administration of Stadelheim Prison. While stationed at Stadelheim, Freikorps Epp extrajudicially killed Gustav Landauer, a notable German anarchist, along with massacring Kolping Society apprentices in Giesing. Adolf Hitler witnessed the destruction of the Bavarian Soviet Republic firsthand while stationed in Munich, and was even hired by Epp as an informant to root out German Communists from the military.

== Disbandment and restructuring ==
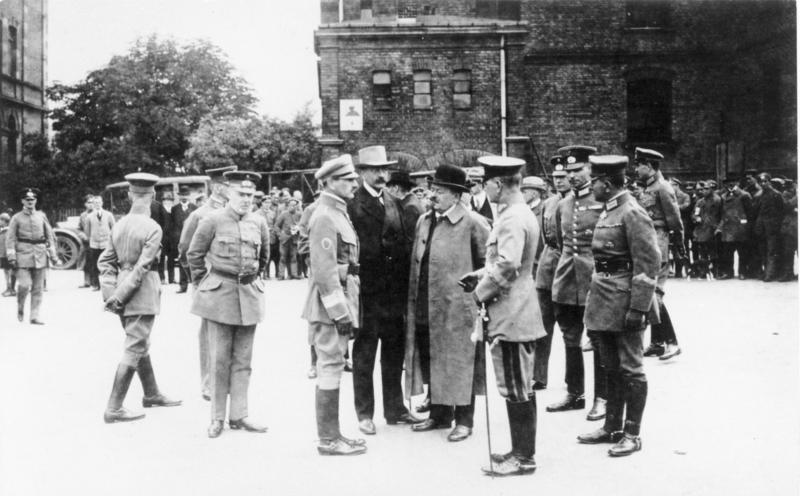
Reich President Friedrich Ebert and Reich Defense Minister Gustav Noske meet Franz Ritter von Epp at the incorporation of the Bavarian Army into the Reichswehr, Munich, Marsfeld Barracks, August 25, 1919

In the summer of 1919, Freikorps Epp was disbanded and incorporated into the Reichswehr as Reichswehr-Brigade 21 München, and the unit was informally known as the Epp Brigade. Epp led the Epp Brigade from May 14, 1919 until September 30, 1920. Other units, including the Freikorps Oberland and Freikorps Bogendörfer, were also integrated into the brigade. The unit was restructured as follows:

- 1. Bayerisches Reichswehr-Schützen-Regiment 41 (infantry)
- 2. Bayerisches Reichswehr-Schützen-Regiment 42 (infantry)
- Bayerisches Reichswehr-Jäger-Battalion 21 (Jäger light infantry)
- Bayerisches Reichswehr-Kavallerie-Regiment 21 (cavalry)
- 1. Bayerisches Leichtes Artillerie-Regiment 21 (light artillery)
- 1. Bayerisches Schwere Artillerie-Abteilung 21 (heavy artillery)

== Suppression of the Ruhr uprising ==
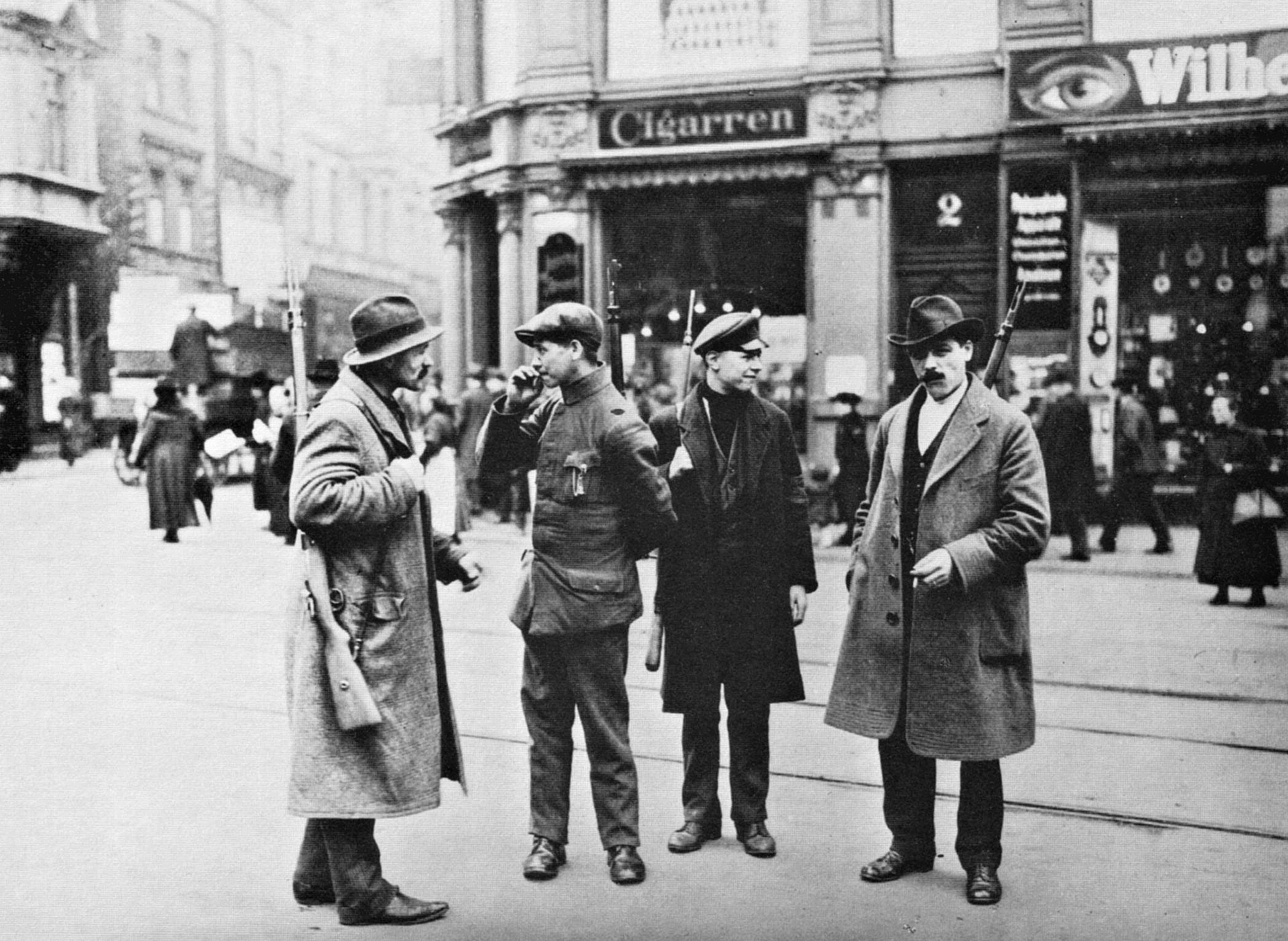
Members of the Ruhr Red Army in Dortmund, 1920

On March 23, 1920, Epp's Brigade along with other Reichswehr units, including Freikorps Lichtschlag, Freikorps Aulock, and the Marine-Brigade von Loewenfeld were deployed to the Ruhr region of North Rhine-Westphalia in order to suppress the Ruhr uprising which was a direct result of the ongoing Kapp Putsch. On March 31, 1919 the Reichswehr and Epp Brigade encountered elements of the Ruhr Red Army near Herringen and the Radbod Mine in Bockum-Hövel. The Epp Brigade killed between 150 and 300 workers at the mine, many of which were likely civilians and had no part in the uprising. The Reichswehr only stopped at the Ruhr because the British Army of the Rhine threatened to occupy the Bergisches Land for violating the Treaty of Versailles.

According to author Robert G. L. Waite:

In the Ruhr, hundreds of Free Corps prisoners were rounded up and shot 'while attempting to escape', and once again, as in Munich and the Baltic, dozens of citizens were sentenced to death by illegal Freebooter 'courts-martial'.

== War crimes ==
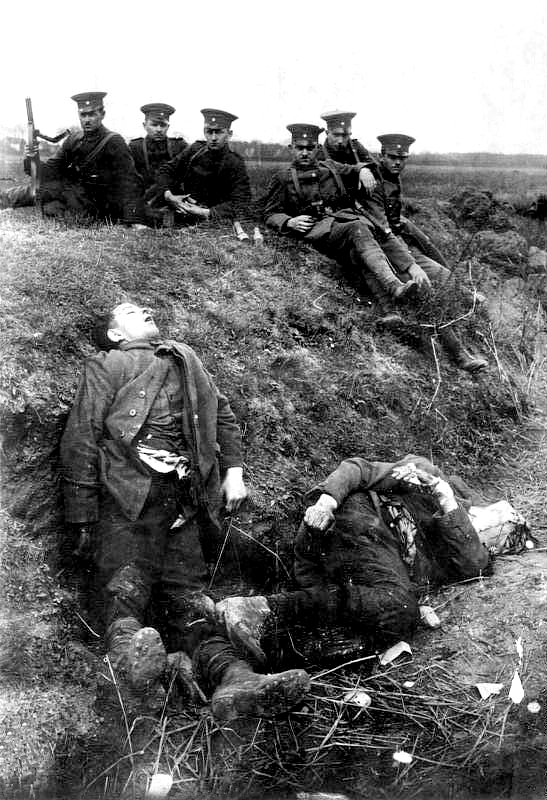
Reichswehr soldiers pose next to dead members of the Ruhr Red Army in Möllen near Duisburg on April 2, 1920

Freikorps Epp is noted to have taken part in several war crimes during its existence. These included the murder of Gustav Landauer at Stadelheim Prison, the Munich journeyman murder, the murder of 100 civilians in Hamm-Pelkum during the Ruhr uprising and the murder of between 100 and 300 workers at the Radbod Mine.

== Later history ==
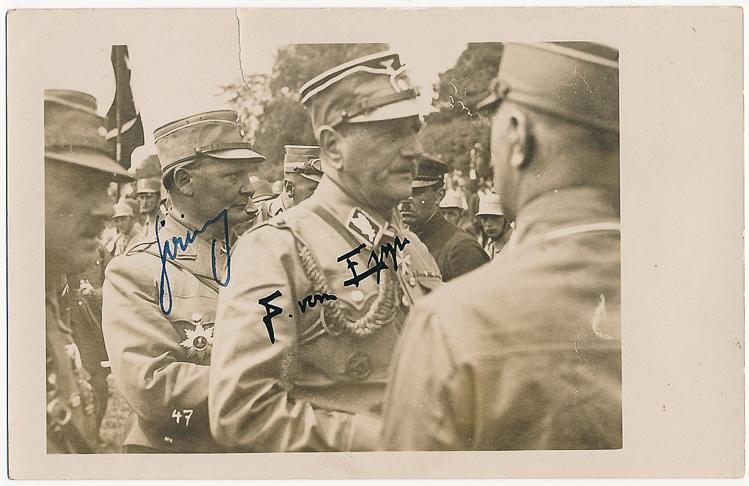
Hermann Göring and Franz Ritter von Epp in Sturmabteilung uniforms in 1930

Epp commanded the 7th Division of the Reichswehr from October 1, 1920 to October 31, 1923, and was promoted to the rank of Generalmajor on 2 October 1921. Due to political reasons, Epp resigned from the Reichswehr in 1923. In 1926, Epp joined the Sturmabteilung (SA) with the rank of Brigadeführer and commanded the SA in Munich and, eventually, in all of Bavaria. In 1928, Epp formally joined the Nazi Party and was heavily involved in Nazi politics from 1928 to 1945, holding multiple offices. Following the Nazi seizure of power, Epp became the Reichsstatthalter (Reich governor) of Bavaria in April 1933, a post he held until being arrested by the American military at the end of the Second World War.

== Notable members ==
Several members and associates of Freikorps Epp would go on to serve in political, military and paramilitary roles within the Nazi Party and the government of Nazi Germany. This list includes, but is not limited to:

- Joseph Friedrich Abert
- Hans Baur
- Karl Baur
- Wilhelm Brückner
- Theodor Casella
- Karl Maria Demelhuber
- Otto Deßloch
- Eduard Dietl
- Oskar Dirlewanger
- Hans Frank
- Rudolf Hess
- Adolf Hitler (as informant)
- Hans Georg Hofmann
- Adolf Hühnlein
- Edgar Jung
- Hans Kopfermann
- Otto Lancelle
- Max von Laue
- Benno Martin
- Oskar von Niedermayer
- Hans Rattenhuber
- Ernst Röhm
- Hans Schemm
- Joseph Schmid
- Wilhelm Schmid
- August Schmidhuber
- August Schneidhuber
- Ferdinand Schörner
- Walter Schultze
- Gregor Strasser
- Otto Strasser
- Wilhelm Stuckart
- Friedrich-Jobst Volckamer von Kirchensittenbach
- Gerhard Wagner
- Friedrich Weber
- Wilhelm Weiss
