= World War I Memorial in Bobrek =

War memorial in Bobrek

- Polish: Pomnik mieszkańców Bobrka poległych w I wojnie światowej
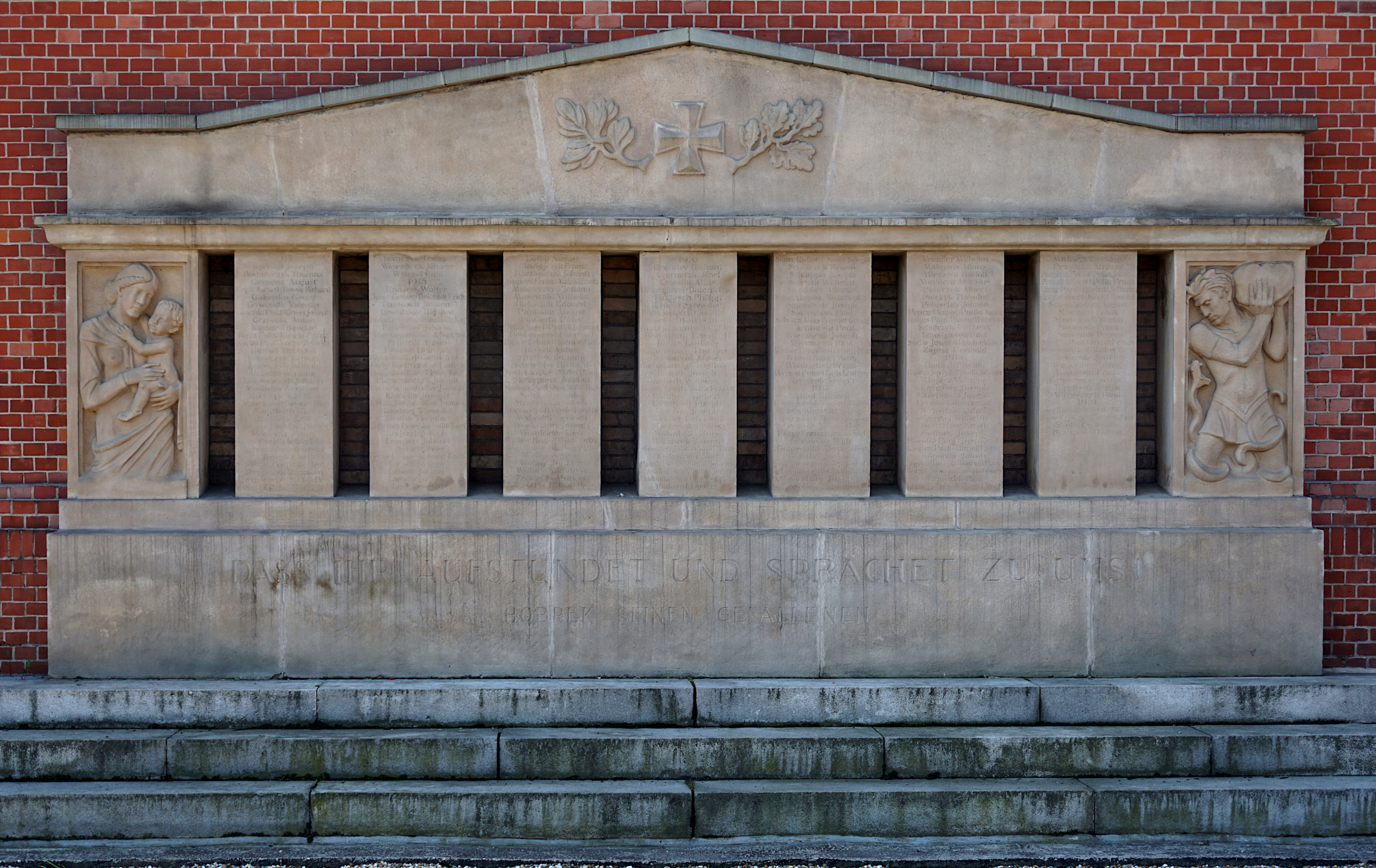
- The monument in June 2021.
- Location: Bytom, Poland
- Coordinates: 50°20′09″N 18°52′13″E
- Designer: Richard Ulmer
- Material: limestone
- Length: 6,6 m
- Height: 2,2 m
- Opening date: June 21, 1925

The Monument to the Fallen Residents of Bobrek during World War I is a memorial situated by the Church of the Holy Family in Bobrek—a district of the city of Bytom in Poland.

Protection over the memorial (as well as the adjacent church) was established in 2009 by the Provincial Office for the Protection of Monuments in Katowice. In recent years, the memorial was restored.

== Description ==
The monument, dedicated to the residents of Bobrek who perished during World War I, is located on the north wall of the Church of the Holy Family in Bytom. It was ceremoniously unveiled on June 21, 1925, being designed by Richard Ulmer, an architect from the Julia Steel Mill (German: Julienhütte) in Bobrek. It measures 6,6 metres in length, 2,2 metres in height, and was constructed with limestone brought in from the Table Mountains (German: Heuscheuergebirge) in the Central Sudetes.

The monument features 7 stone tablets with the names of around 280 perished residents. The majority of the construction was carried out by Thomas Myrtek from Beuthen (now Bytom), with Wilhelm Rose from Gleiwitz (now Gliwice) being commissioned to finish the stone work. Sculptor Ernst Neumeister from Stuttgart designed its bas-reliefs, depicting a woman bearing a child on one side and a man carrying a boulder fighting off a snake on the other. An Iron Cross cradled by an olive branch (a symbol of peace) and an oak branch (a symbol of endurance) towers over the memorial's elements. The plinth contains the inscription "Dass Ihr aufständet und sprächet zu uns! Bobrek seinen Gefallenen" (That you may rise and speak to us! Bobrek to its fallen).

== Gallery ==
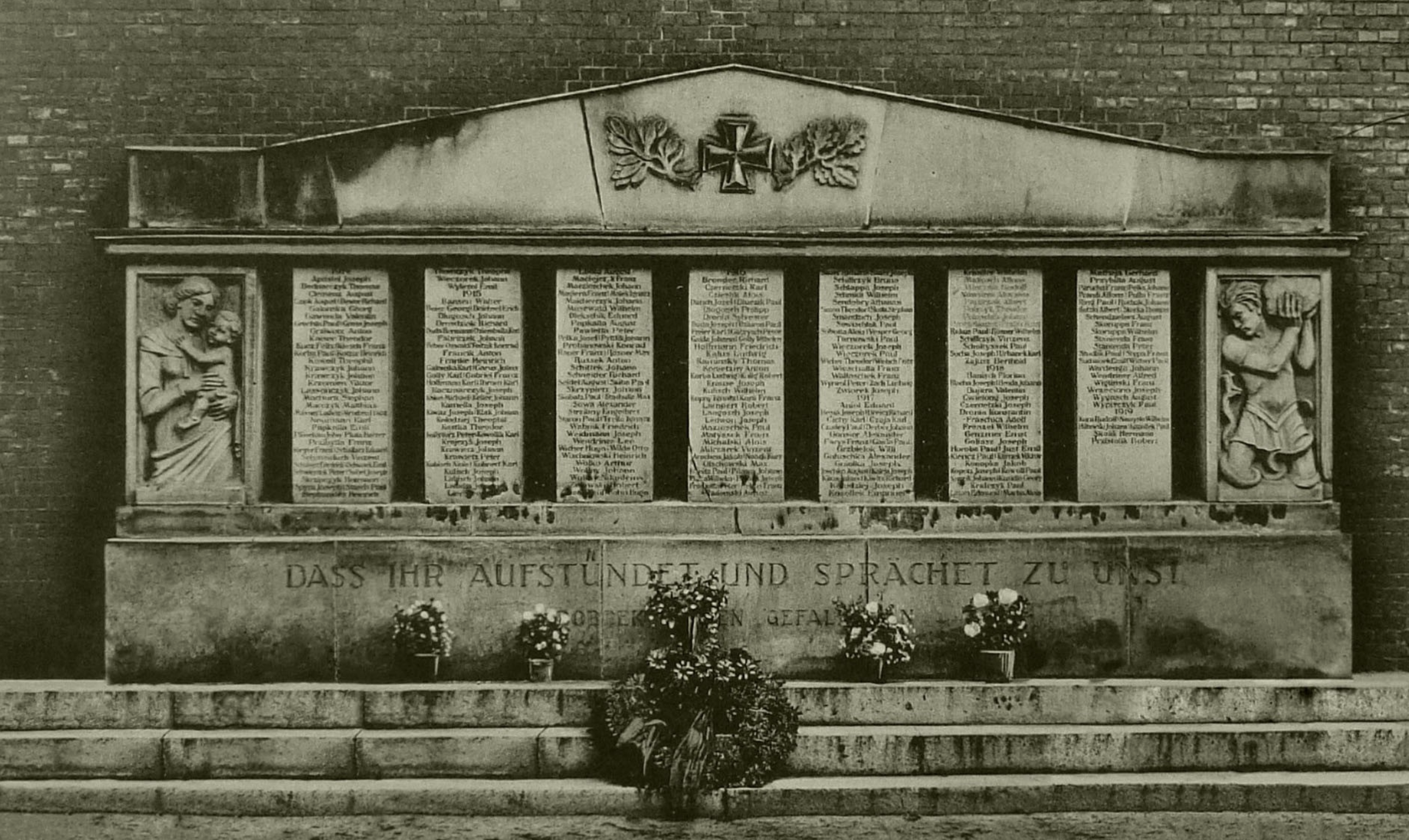
The monument during the interwar period.

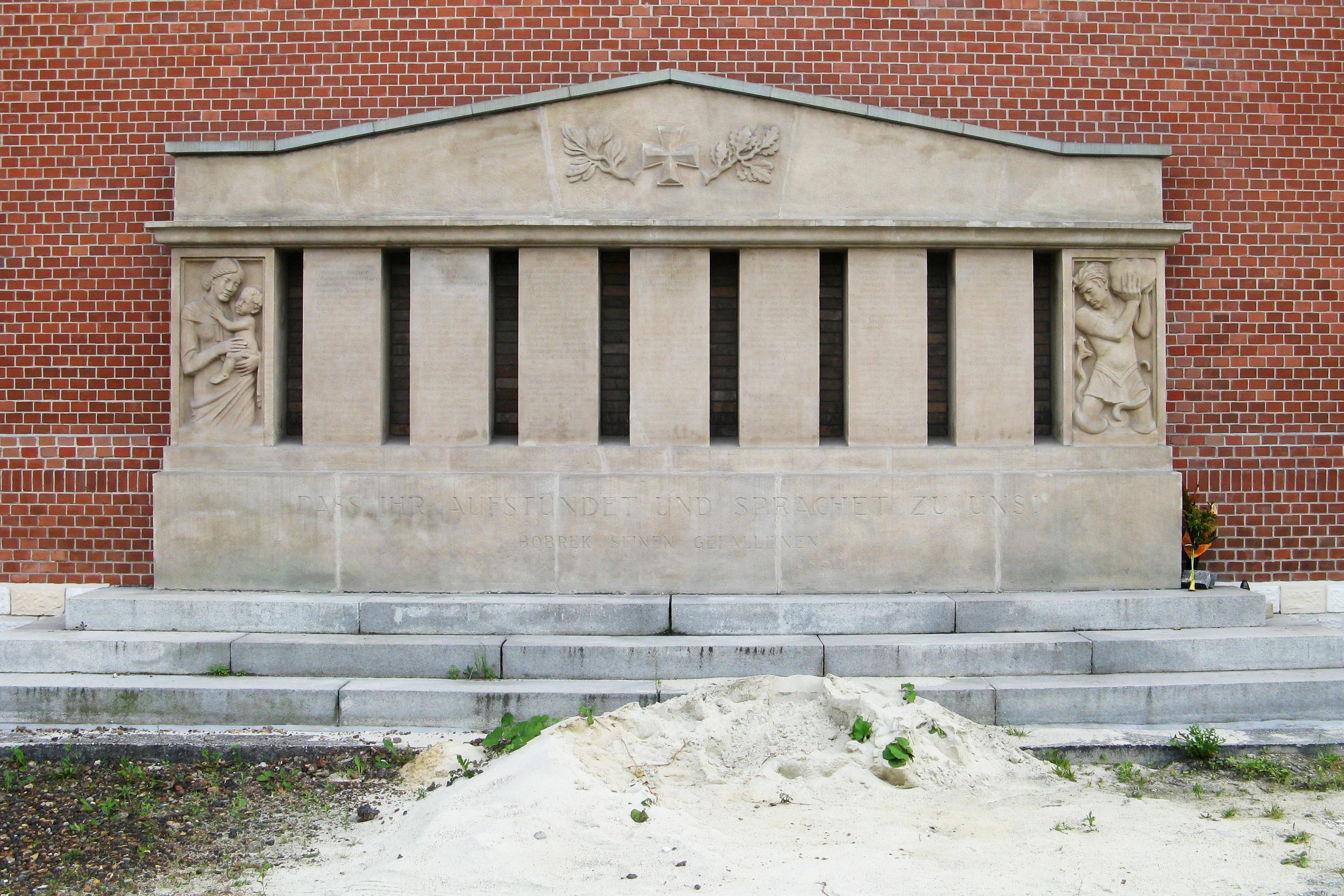
The monument in October 2018.
