= Landkreis Leobschütz =

District in Silesia from 1743 to 1945

Landkreis Leobschütz (Leobschütz district) was a Prussian district in Silesia, from 1743 to 1945, with its capital at Leobschütz. Its historical roots lie in the Duchy of Leobschütz.

== History ==
After most of Silesia fell under Prussian rule, King Frederick the Great introduced Prussian administrative structures in Lower Silesia in 1742 and in Upper Silesia in 1743. In the course of the Prussian Reform Movement, the district of Leobschütz was assigned to Regierungsbezirk Oppeln in the Province of Silesia.

During the district reform of 1 January 1818 in Regierungsbezirk Oppeln, the district boundaries were changed as follows:

- The villages of Berndau, Damasko, Gläsen, Kasimir, Schönau, Steubendorf and Thomnitz moved from the Neustadt district to the Leobschütz district.
- The city of Hultschin, the areas of Beneschau and Zauditz and the villages of Autoschowitz, Benenschau, Bielau, Bobrownick, Bolatitz, Boleslau, Boratin, Buslawitz, Chlebsch, Cosmütz, Deutsch Krawarn, Ellgoth, Groß Darkowitz, Groß Hoschütz, Groß Peterwitz, Halsch, Henneberg, Hoschialkowitz, Kauthen, Klein Darkowitz, Klein Hoschütz, Klein Peterwitz, Koblau, Köberwitz, Kranowitz, Kuchelna, Langendorf, Ludgerzowitz, Marquartowitz, Odersch, Owschütz, Peterzkowitz, Pyscha, Ratsch, Rohow, Schammerwitz, Schlausewitz, Schreibersdorf, Schillersdorf, Sczepankowitz, Strandorf, Thröm, Wrbkau, Wrzesin, Zabrzeg and Zawada moved from the Leobschütz district to the Ratibor district.

On 8 November 1919 the province of Silesia was dissolved. The new Province of Upper Silesia was formed from Regierungsbezirk Oppeln. In the Upper Silesia plebiscite held on 20 March 1921, 99.6% of the voters in the Leobschütz district voted for Germany and 0.4% voted for Poland. Consequently, the district remained in Germany in the interwar period. On 1 April 1938 the provinces of Lower Silesia and Upper Silesia were merged to form the Province of Silesia. On 18 January 1941, the province of Silesia was dissolved again and the province of Upper Silesia was formed, including territories annexed from Poland. In the spring of 1945, the Red Army captured the district and placed it under Polish administration, after which the German population of the district was expelled.

== Demographics ==
The district had a majority German population, with significant Czech and Polish minorities.

Population of Leobschutz district
	1828		1843		1855		1858		1861	
Germans	45,117	77.9%	55,263	79.5%	58,611	80.5%	61,379	81.3%	64,391	81.9%
Czechs	7,760	13.4%	10,166	14.6%	11,038	15.2%	11,567	15.3%	12,428	15.8%
Poles	5,060	8.7%	4,090	5.9%	3,151	4.3%	2,572	3.4%	1,775	2.3%
Total	57,937		69,519		72,800		75,518		78,594	

== Place Names ==
In 1936, several communities in the Leobschütz district were renamed:

- Badewitz → Badenau
- Boblowitz → Hedwigsgrund
- Dirschkowitz → Dirschkowitz
- Hratschein → Burgfeld
- Jakubowitz → Jakobsfelde
- Kittelwitz → Kitteldorf
- Osterwitz → Osterdorf
- Peterwitz → Zietenbusch
- Thomnitz → Thomas
- Tschirmke → Schirmke
- Waissak → Lindau
- Wanowitz → Hubertusruh
- Wehowitz → Wehen
- Zauchwitz → Dreimühlen
- Zülkowitz → Zinnatal
