= Schomberg Municipality =

Schomberg Gemeinde Schomberg
- Gemeinde
- Interactive map of Schomberg
- Coordinates (Szombierki): 50°20′0″N 18°53′0″E
- Country: German Empire (to 1918); German Reich (1918-1933); German Reich (1933-1945)
- Province: Silesia
- Rural District: Beuthen District
- Seat: Schomberg

Population (1939)
  - Total: 7,464

Gemeinde Schomberg (Polish: Gmina Szombierki), was a municipality in the District of Beuthen, part of the Silesian Province of Germany. Its seat was the town of Schomberg (now a district of Bytom).

== History ==
During the Upper Silesian plebiscite in 1921, 3328 people in the Schomberg municipality took part in the voting.

Results:

	Votes for Germany	Votes for Poland	Emigrants	Total Votes	Total Population of municipality
Municipality/Gemeinde	702	1996	110	2698	4832
Estate Area/Gutsbezirk	244	371	16	615	1167

Even though the majority of Schomberg's residents voted to join Poland, the village remained under German rule after the plebiscite era.

In 1930 the municipality became the owner of the Fazaniec Park.

The municipality of Schomberg ceased to exist in 1945 following the Polish takeover of Silesia. Under the new Polish administration a new municipality (Gmina) was formed in Schomberg and the town's name was changed to Chruszczów.

== Demographics ==
Population of the municipality (Gemeinde) of Schomberg:

	Population
Year	Number
1905	3837
1910	4832
1919	5549
1933	8081
1939	7446

Nationality (according to the German census of 1910):

	German	%	Polish	%	Total Population	%
Municipality/Gemeinde	841	17.4%	3770	78%	4832	100%
Estate Area/Gutsbezirk	393	33.7%	624	53.5%	1167	100%

== See also ==
- Old Town Hall, Szombierki

== Sources ==
- Beuthen-Tarnowitz
- Willkommen bei Gemeindeverzeichnis.de
- Wyniki plebiscytu na Górnym Śląsku. Dziewulski, Stefan. Warszawa 1922.
