= Bytom Synagogue =

Former Reform synagogue in Breslau, Germany

- The former synagoge in c. 1904

- Location of the former synagogue in Germany, as it was in 1937

Religion
- Affiliation: Reform Judaism (former)
- Ecclesiastical or organisational status: Synagogue (1869–1938)
- Status: Destroyed

Location
- Location: Beuthen, Province of Silesia (now Bytom)
- Country: Germany (now Poland)
- Coordinates: 50°20′52″N 18°55′30″E

Architecture
- Type: Synagogue architecture
- Style: Moorish Revival
- Destroyed: November 1938 (during Kristallnacht

The Bytom Synagogue or Beuthen Synagogue was a former Reform Jewish congregation and synagogue, located in Beuthen, in the Prussian Province of Silesia. The town is now located in present-day Bytom, Poland, a border–town between Germany and the Second Polish Republic prior to German invasion of Poland in World War II. After the plebiscite of 1922, the border passed just east of Beuthen, so that neighboring Katowice was in Poland.

Built in 1869, the synagogue was destroyed by Nazis on November 9, 1938, during Kristallnacht.

== History of the congregation ==
The Beuthen Jewish Community was one of twenty-five Jewish communities of the district of Oppeln, established in the city of Beuthen. The community comprised a Jewish primary school supported by the city, a religious school, 13 charitable societies, and four institutions, prior to the German invasion of Poland. Jews lived there from 1421. Despite the separation of Beuthen, and the neighbouring Katowice (Poland), the area was kept as an economic unit, with guarantees on the movement of goods, material, and labour.

The Jewish population of Beuthen during the inter-war period was approximately 3,500 (according to Mokotov) or 5,000 according to a former resident, who recalls that approximately 4,000 Jews left Beuthen between 1933 and 1939. On November 7, 1938, Joseph Goebbels delivered a fiery anti-Semitic tirade in Beuthen, with a call for vengeance.

During World War II, Beuthen's Jews, numbering approximately 1,300, became the first Holocaust transport to be gassed inside "Bunker I" at Auschwitz-Birkenau death camp, all murdered on 15 February 1942 at the onset of the Nazi German Holocaust in Poland.

== History of the synagogue ==
Beuthen Synagogue was built in 1869 on Friedrich-Wilhelm-Ring (now Plac Grunwaldzki), in place of an older one. The cornerstone was set on May 25, 1868, construction finished on July 2, 1869. Max Kopfstein (1856–1924) from Bad Ems became rabbi and religion teacher there in 1889. Chief Rabbi from 1919, he participated in the negotiations of the Treaty of Versailles as an expert in matters concerning the Jewish population in Upper Silesia.

The synagogue was burned down by Nazi German SS and SA troopers during the Kristallnacht on 9–10 November 1938. Members of the congregation were made to stand for hours in front of their burning Moorish Revival synagogue. A memorial plaque at the site was erected on November 9, 2007.

== See also ==
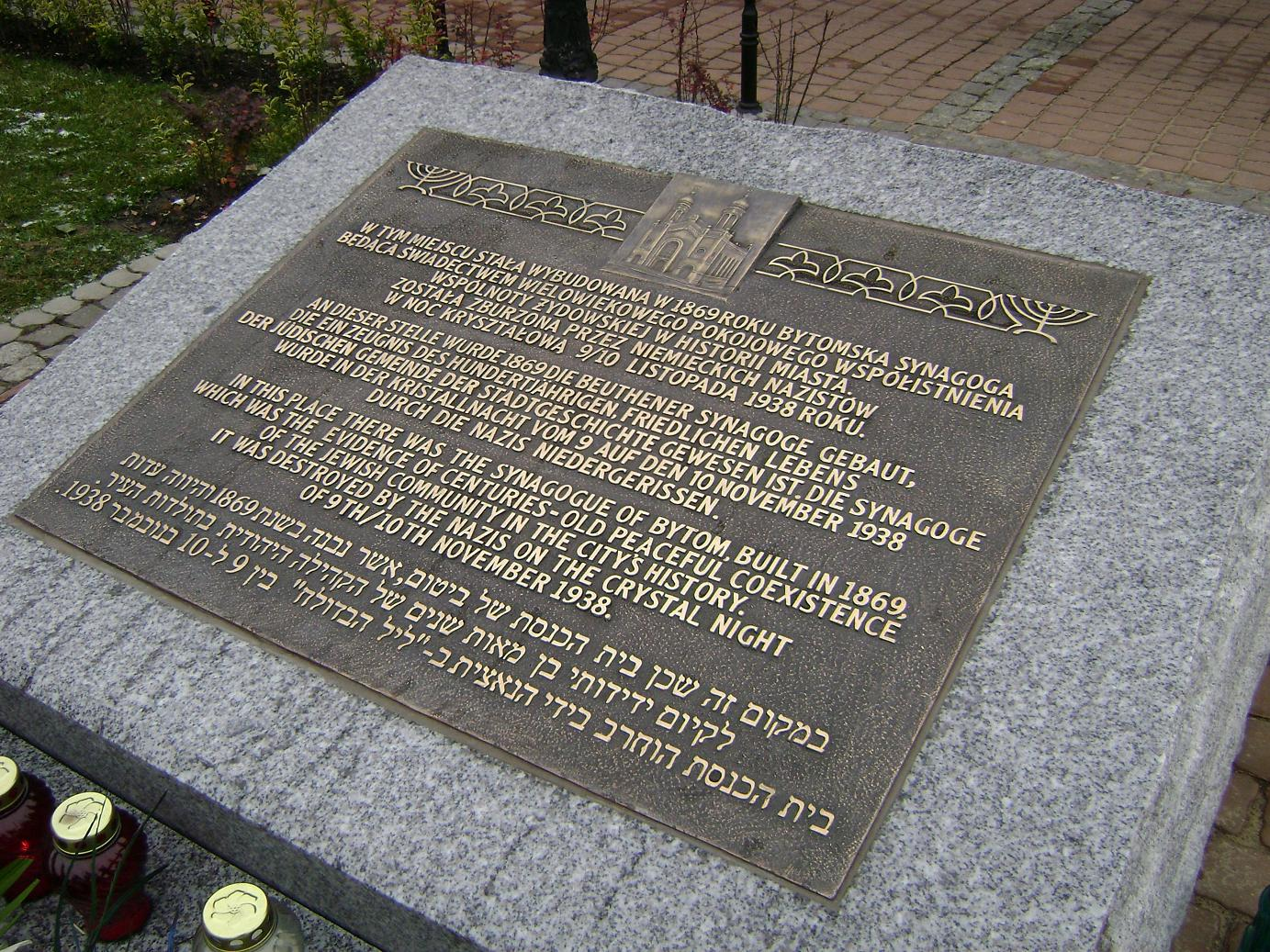
Memorial plaque with Polish, German, English and Hebrew inscription

- History of the Jews in Germany
- History of the Jews in Poland
- List of synagogues in Germany (in German)
- List of synagogues in Poland
