= Freikorps Werdenfels =

Weimarian military unit (April–May 1919)

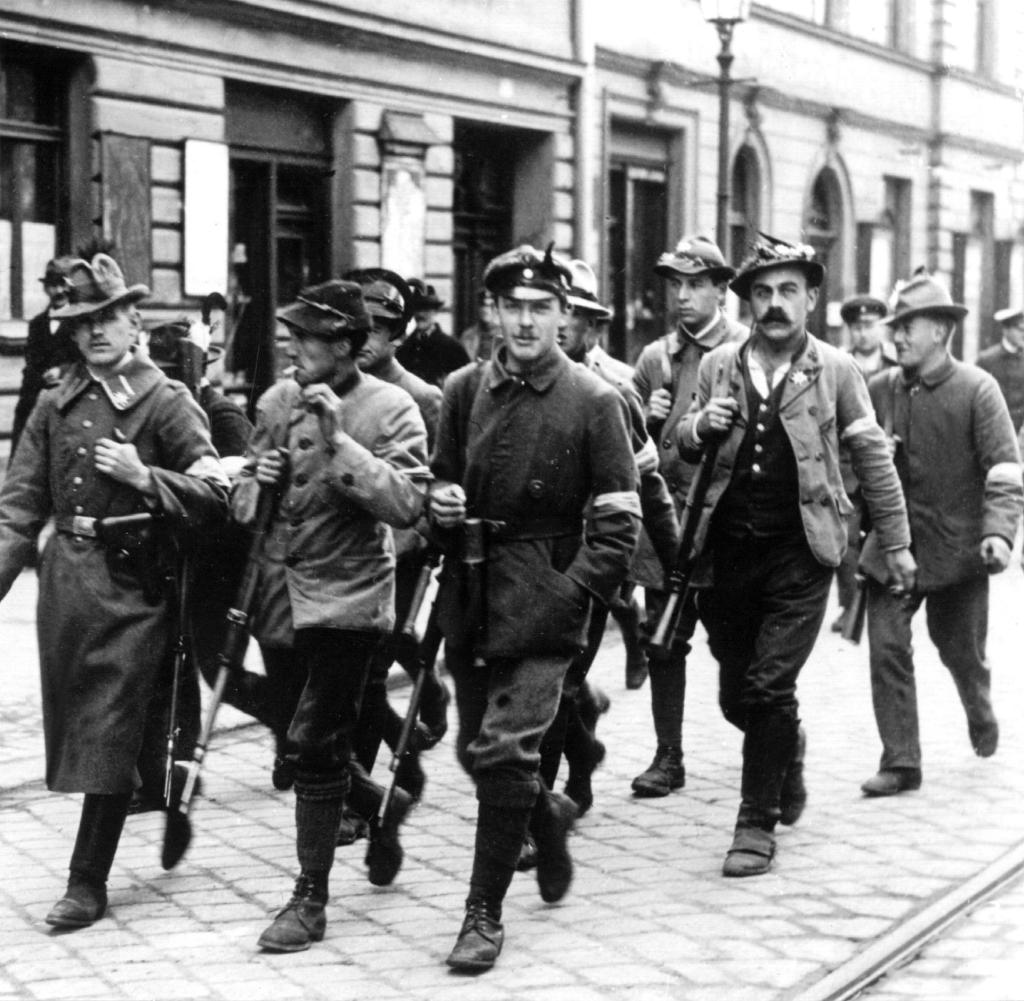
- Possible members of Freikorps Werdenfels in Munich, 1919.
- Active: April 21, 1919 - May 11, 1919
- Disbanded: May 11, 1919
- Country: Germany
- Allegiance: Reichswehr
- Type: Freikorps
- Size: 250-260
- Engagements: German Revolution of 1918–19; Bavarian Soviet Republic

Commanders
- Commander: Josef Ritter von Reiss

Freikorps Werdenfels was a small paramilitary and Freikorps of the Weimar Republic which was raised in April 1919 to help suppress the Bavarian Soviet Republic following the German revolution of 1918–1919. The unit fought under the command of Freikorps Epp, commanded by Franz Ritter von Epp. The unit is known for its use of the traditional German Tracht rather than an official militia uniform.

== History ==
Freikorps Werdenfels was established in April 1919 in Garmisch-Partenkirchen. Its namesake is likely derived from Werdenfelser Land, an area in the County of Werdenfels in Bavaria. Although founded in 1919, Freikorps Werdenfels had its origins as the Garmisch People's Militia (Volkswehr Garmisch) during the German revolution of 1918–1919. During the 1918-1919 Revolution the militia was involved in a skirmish with members of the Communist Party of Germany in Lahnewiesgraben. The unit was commanded by Major Josef Ritter von Reiß (Reiss), a veteran of World War I, Ritter, and recipient of the Military Order of Max Joseph. The unit numbered approximately 250-260 men.

== Role in suppressing the Bavarian Soviet Republic ==
Freikorps Werdenfels was deployed against the Bavarian Soviet Republic in early May 1919 along with Freikorps Epp and many other Freikorps and Reichswehr units. During this time it was placed under the command of Franz Ritter von Epp and the Bayerische Schützenkorps (also called Freikorps Epp), where it was held as a reserve component of the main attacking force at Giesing. While deployed to Giesing Freikorps Werdenfels became known for its lack of discipline, Hauptmann Josef Siedel stated:

"This Werdenfels Freikorps was... a shambles without any discipline or soldierly seriousness. The march to Munich was nothing more than 'a fun time' for these men."

The unit suffered no casualties during its deployment to Munich, Freikorps Werdenfels took part in the victory parade before it was officially disbanded on May 11, 1919. German photographer Heinrich Hoffmann, later the personal photographer for Adolf Hitler, photographed much of the Freikorps while it was in Munich. Freikorps Werdenfels later played a critical role in German propaganda. According to Bavarikon "Photos of the Freikorps were to convey the message that peace-loving, down-to-earth farmers and citizens had liberated the state capital". Many images of Freikorps Werdenfels are held by the Bavarian State Library.

== Uniform and insignia ==
Members of Freikorps Werdenfels wore an armband in the colors of Bavaria (the top half in white, the lower half in light blue) with the inscription "Freikorps Werdenfels” on the top half. Members of Freikorps Werdenfels were allowed to wear the badge of the Bayerisches Schützenkorps (Freikorps Epp) on their left arm. A less elaborate version without the badge and bearing only a black diamond in the center was also worn. The unit had no official uniform to identify itself as a militia with the exception of their armbands. Many of the units members elected to wear their Tracht and the common Tyrolean hat as opposed to any official uniform.

== See also ==
- Freikorps
- Freikorps Epp
- Bavarian Soviet Republic
- German Revolution of 1918–1919
