= Ehrhardt E-V/4 =

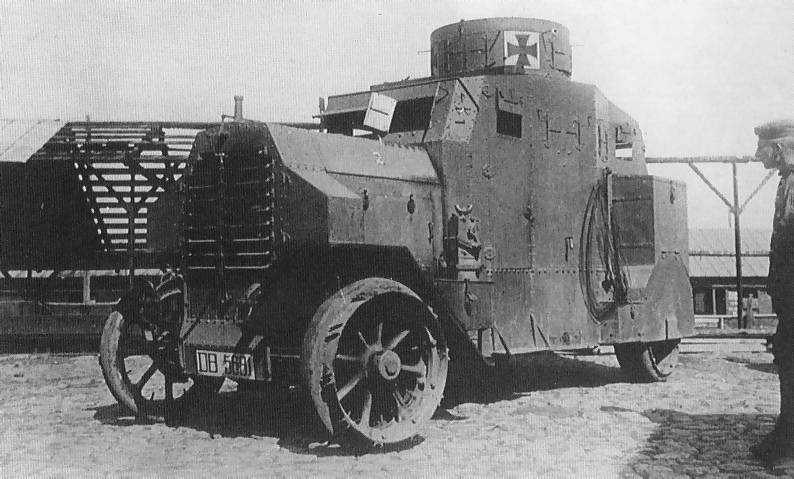
- Type: Armored car
- Place of origin: Germany

Production history
- No. built: 53

Specifications
- Mass: 7.12 - 7.75 tons
- Length: 5.3 m
- Width: 2 m
- Height: 2.85 m
- Crew: 8 or 9
- Armor: up to 9 mm
- Main armament: Usually 3 machine guns
- Engine: petrol 80 hp (59 kw)
- Power/weight: 10.3 hp/ton
- Suspension: four-wheel drive
- Operational range: 250 km
- Maximum speed: 61.3 km/h

The E-V/4 Panzerkraftwagen Ehrhardt was one of the first examples of a type of high and flat-sided armored car design that the Germans used almost until the start of the Second World War for internal policing duties. It weighed nearly 9 tons, had a crew of eight or nine, and carried an armament of up to three machine-guns.

== History ==
=== Conception and design ===
The very first German armoured cars were special large car or truck chassis adapted to carry a skyward-looking artillery piece for use against observation balloons. These vehicles were collectively known as Ballon Abwehr Kanonen (BAK), though none were taken into large-scale use.

The Belgians were the first to demonstrate the potential of the armoured car in mobile warfare, with the Minerva Armoured Car. German infantry and cavalry were at times distinctly inconvenienced by the hit-and-run tactics employed by the Belgian armoured cars. Having suffered somewhat at the hands of these vehicles, the German Army decided to produce its own armoured car, but without any practical experience they approached the car manufacturing companies Ehrhardt, Daimler and Büssing, and ordered a prototype armoured car from each.

During 1915, the three companies produced the ordered prototypes. In all three cases, the companies chose to ignore the fact that the Belgian armoured cars were little more than converted touring cars, and developed what they perceived to be more suitable vehicles. As a result, all three prototypes were massive vehicles, the largest of which were the Büssing. This vehicle used a 'double-ended' layout that could at least pose a tactically useful high ground clearance. The Ehrhardt and Daimler designs were very similar. Both placed the engine in the front, surrounded by armour, and had a large box-like body at the rear with a turret or cupolas on the top. Both sported a clumsy appearance, and was far too heavy for the effective fulfillment of the operational tasks the German Army demanded of them.

The Daimler and Ehrhardt prototypes were both reliant on the use of double wheels on each side of the rear, and had flanges on the single wheels at the front of the vehicle, in an effort to reduce ground pressure and so enhance the cross-country mobility of the vehicle to a useful degree. All three cars had a crew of eight or nine men, carried an armament of at least three machine guns, and possessed a maximum armour thickness of 9 mm.

=== Operational history ===
Along with some improvised conversions, the three prototypes were formed into one unit and sent to first the Baltic and then to the Western Front. Conditions on both fronts were so bad that armoured cars could achieve very little, and the vehicles were eventually deployed on the Russian part of the Eastern Front, where they could at least use their mobility to some effect. It was then that there emerged a need for more vehicles, and so Ehrhardt was contracted to build a further 20 vehicles. These vehicles were 1.72 tons lighter than the original Panzerkraftwagen Ehrhardt 1915. Designated the Panzerkampfwagen Ehrhardt 1917, these vehicles were completed with revised frontal armour. The vehicles were sent to the Eastern Front and served there until the end of the fighting there late in 1917, two of them taking part in Battle of Mărășești against the Romanians, however with little success, as the Germans failed to break the Romanian front. Thereafter they were retained in Germany for internal policing duties. They were so successful in this role that an additional 20 vehicles were ordered and produced in 1919. The E-V/4 was in fact considered just what internal policing required, for its height gave it the capacity to tower over crowds and offer police units better control of riots. E-V/4s were in use almost until World War II.

The demand for armoured cars was so high that by 1918, the Germans were forced to employ numbers of captured armoured cars of Rolls-Royce or other make, and the Ehrhardt vehicles were never around in sufficient numbers. On the Eastern Front the cars were never able to make much of a tactical impression, and so the design is now little known and few operational details have survived. Though many surviving Erhardt E-V/4s were still used by the German police until 1939, none survive today.
