= Joseph Friedrich Abert =

German historian and archivist

- Born: 11 June 1879
- Died: 25 October 1959 (aged 80)

Joseph Friedrich Abert (11 June 1879 – 25 October 1959, Würzburg) was a German historian and archivist.

== Life ==
Abert was born in 1879 in Würzburg. His uncle was the Roman Catholic Archbishop of Bamberg, Friedrich Philipp von Abert. In 1898 he passed his final exams, and studied history in Würzburg and Munich. In 1904 he received a Ph.D. in history. His thesis was published in 1905 as Die Wahlkapitulationen der Würzburger Bischöfe bis zum Ende des XVII. Jahrhunderts, 1225-1698. His career as an archivist began as an intern at the General State Archives in Munich in 1904. From 1908 to 1910 he was employed by the Archive of the noble family of Schönborn.

Abert served as a lieutenant in World War I. As a member of the Freikorps "Franz Xaver Ritter von Epp" he was involved in the suppression of the Bavarian Soviet Republic. From 1919 to 1926 he was head of the archives of the city of Würzburg and appointed afterwards Head of the State Archives in Würzburg. In 1928 he became an honorary professor.

Joseph Friedrich Abert lived together with Albrecht Becker (1906-2002) a production designer, photographer, and actor.

During the Nazi era, they were arrested for violating Section 175, the legal ban on homosexuality and imprisoned. Abert lost his membership in the SA and Nazi Party and the privileges as a public servant. Later, he lived for a while in Rome, where he worked at the German Historical Institute of the Repertorium Germanicum. In 1945 he returned to Würzburg, where he died on 25 October 1959.

In the exhibition of the Imperial War Museum in London on the Holocaust the fate of Joseph Friedrich Abert and Albrecht Becker is shown as an example of Nazi-persecution of homosexuals.

== Works ==
- Die Wahlkapitulationen der Würzburger Bischöfe bis zum Ende des XVII. Jahrhunderts, 1225-1698 (Würzburg University Press, 1905)
- Vom Mäzenatentum der Schönborn (Würzburg: Freunde Mainfränkischer Kunst und Geschichte, 1950)
- Aus Würzburgs Biedermeierzeit (Würzburg: Freunde Mainfränkischer Kunst und Geschichte, 1950)
- See also: World Cat: "Most widely held works by Josef Friedrich Abert", accessed January 6, 2010

== Literature ==
- Bernd-Ulrich Hergemöller: Mann für Mann, 2001, Suhrkamp Verlag.
