= Kreis Rybnik =

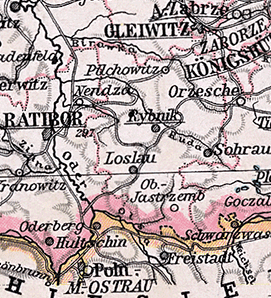
Rybnik district (1905)

The Rybnik district was a Prussian district in Upper Silesia from 1818 to 1926. Its capital was the city of Rybnik. The territory of this district is now in the Silesian Voivodeship in Poland.

== History ==
During the district reform of 1 January 1818 in Regierungsbezirk Oppeln in the Prussian Province of Silesia, the new Rybnik district was formed. On 8 November 1919 the Province of Silesia was dissolved and the new Province of Upper Silesia was formed from Regierungsbezirk Oppeln.

In the Upper Silesia plebiscite held on 20 March 1921, 34.8% of the voters in the Rybnik district voted for Germany and 65.2% voted for Poland. Due to the subsequent resolutions of the Conference of Ambassadors, on 3 July 1922, most of the district was transferred to Poland. The remainder of the district which was still in Germany initially continued to exist formally as a separate district until it was dissolved on 1 January 1927 and divided between the Ratibor district and the Tost-Gleiwitz district.

== Demographics ==
According to the Prussian census of 1855, Kreis Rybnik had a population of 58,411, of which 52,323 (89.58%) were Poles, 6,053 (10.36%) were Germans and 35 (0.06%) were Czechs.
