= Bobrek, Bytom =

Coordinates: 50°20′N 18°52′E

Bobrek
- Bytom District
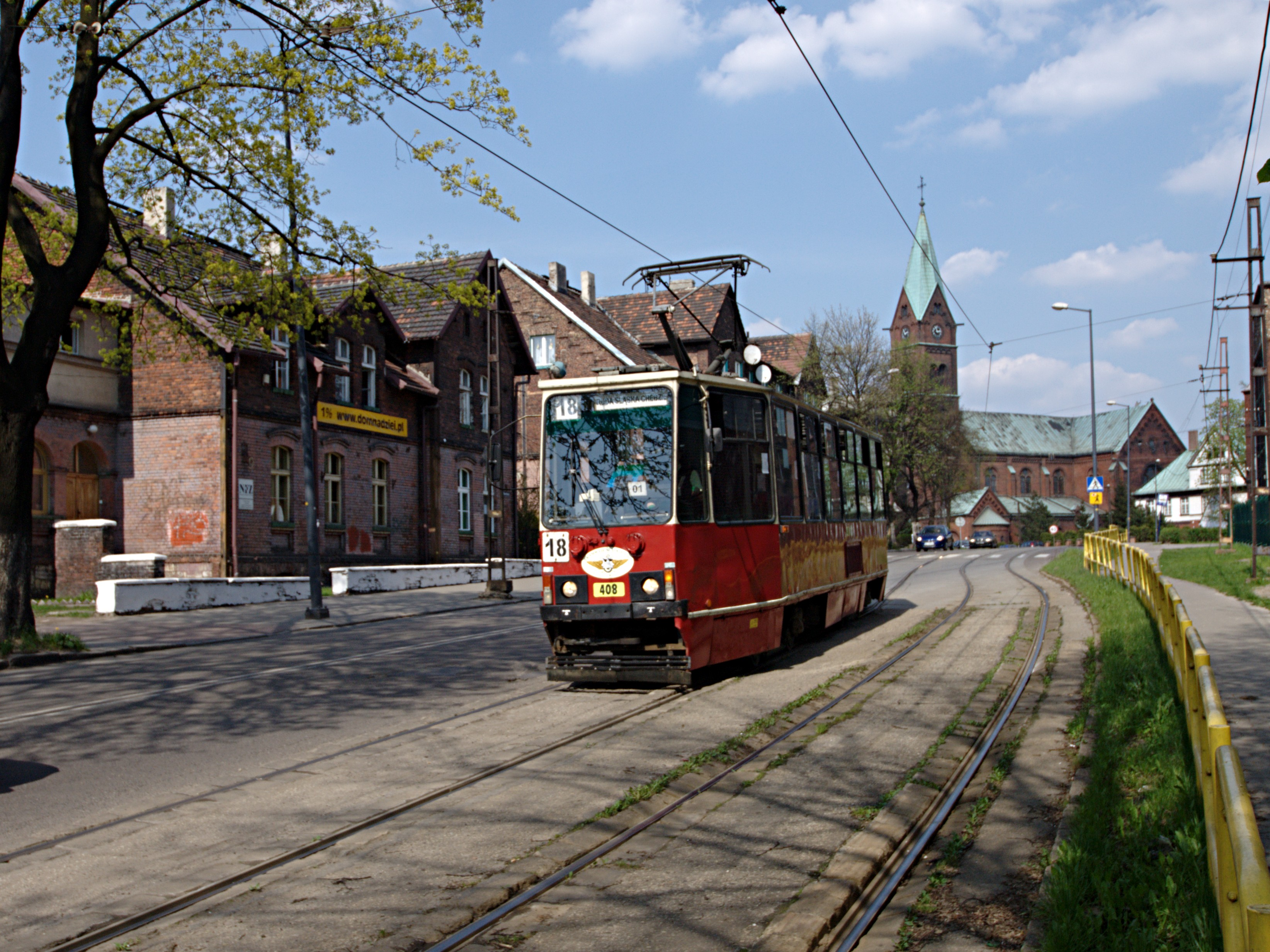
- Tram on constitution street, Bobrek.

- Location of Bobrek within Bytom.
- Country: Poland
- Voivodeship: Silesian
- County/City: Bytom
- First mentioned: 1369
- Within city limits: 1951
- Notable landmarks: Holy Family Church in Bobrek

Area
  - Total: 254 km^{2} (98 sq mi)

Population
  - Total: 4,919
  - Density: 19.4/km^{2} (50.2/sq mi)
- Time zone: UTC+1 (CET)
  - Summer (DST): UTC+2 (CEST)
- Postal code: 41-905
- Vehicle registration: SY

Bobrek (German: Bobrek) is a district of the city of Bytom in the Silesian Voivodeship, Poland. The district borders Szombierki (a district of Bytom) to its east, Karb (another district of Bytom) to its north, Ruda Śląska to its south and Zabrze to its west. As of 2011 it has a population of roughly 5 thousand people.

Bobrek is very closely associated with Karb.

During World War II, the German administration operated three forced labour camps in Bobrek, including a camp solely for Jews and the E209 subcamp of the Stalag VIII-B/344 prisoner of war camp.

== Sport ==
=== Football ===
The first football club established in Bobrek was RKS Górnik Bobrek (founded in 1945). In 1958 the club Bobrek Karb Bytom was established, which became defunct by 2007. Currently the clubs Polonia Bytom and Nadzieja Bytom enjoy great amount of support in the district.

== Notable people ==
- Jerzy Gołkowski (born in the 18th century), Moravian Missionary who worked in Labrador
