= Bytom =

City in Silesian Voivodeship, Poland

Bytom Bytōm / Bytōń (Silesian)
- City county
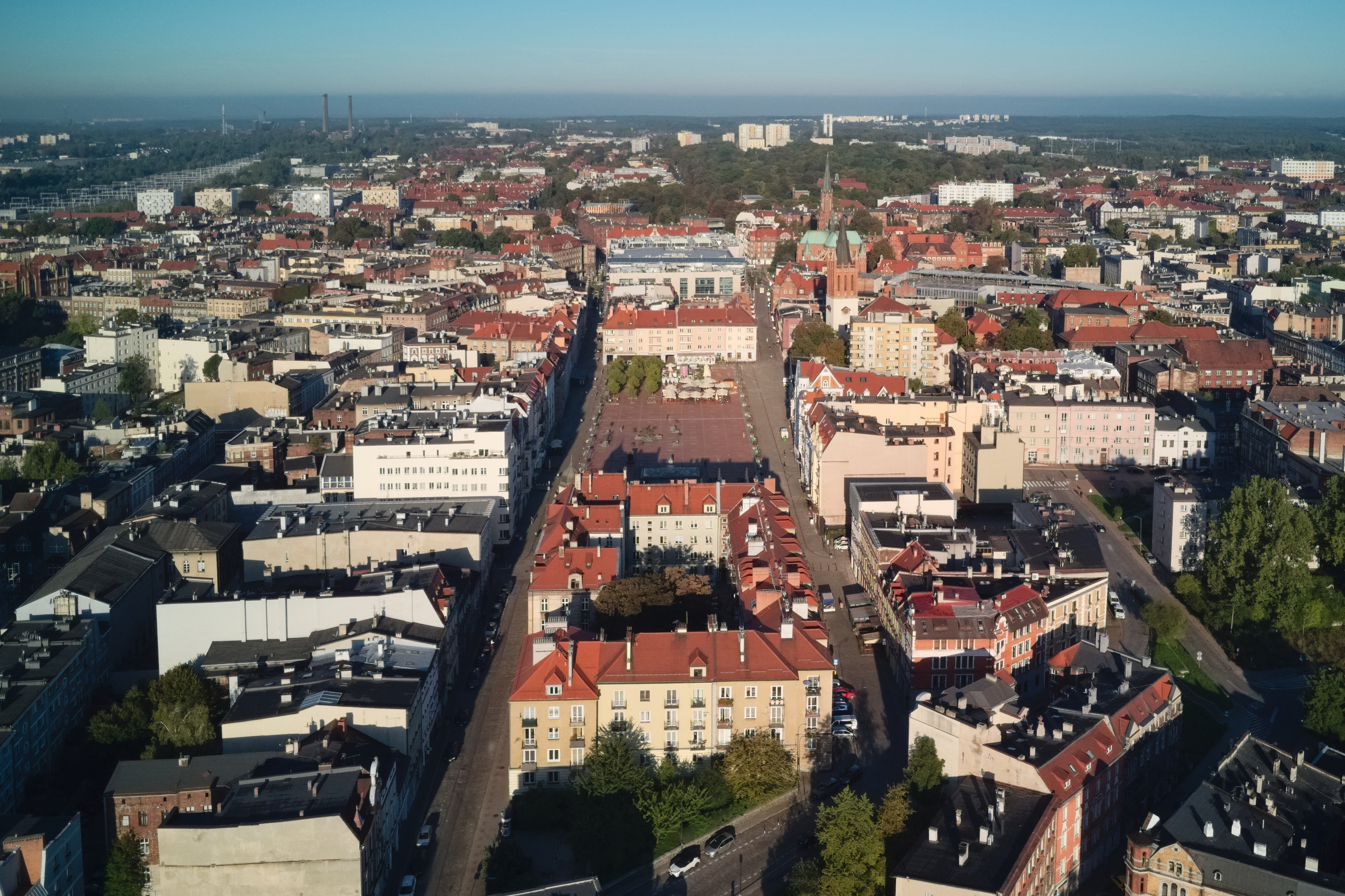
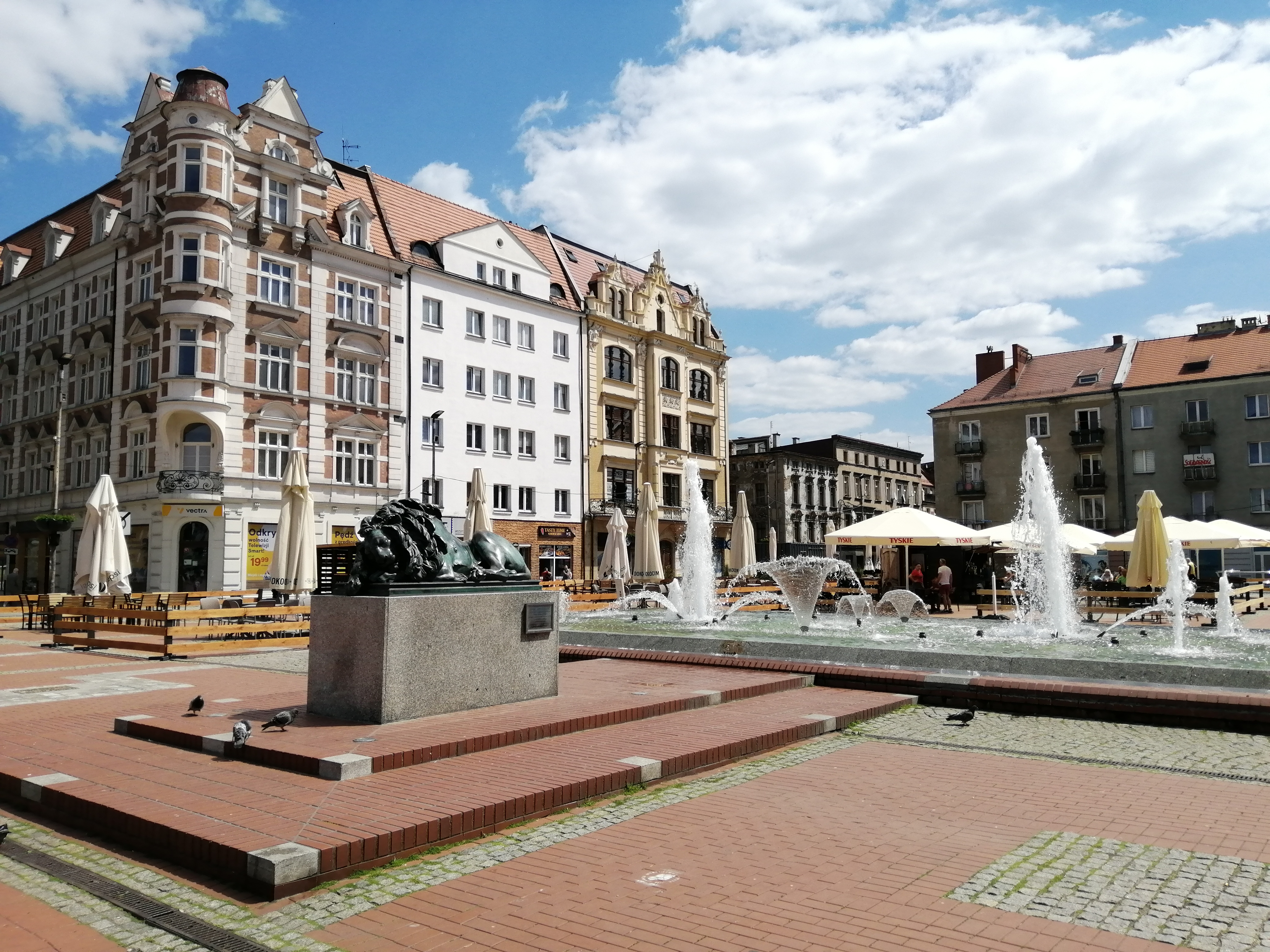
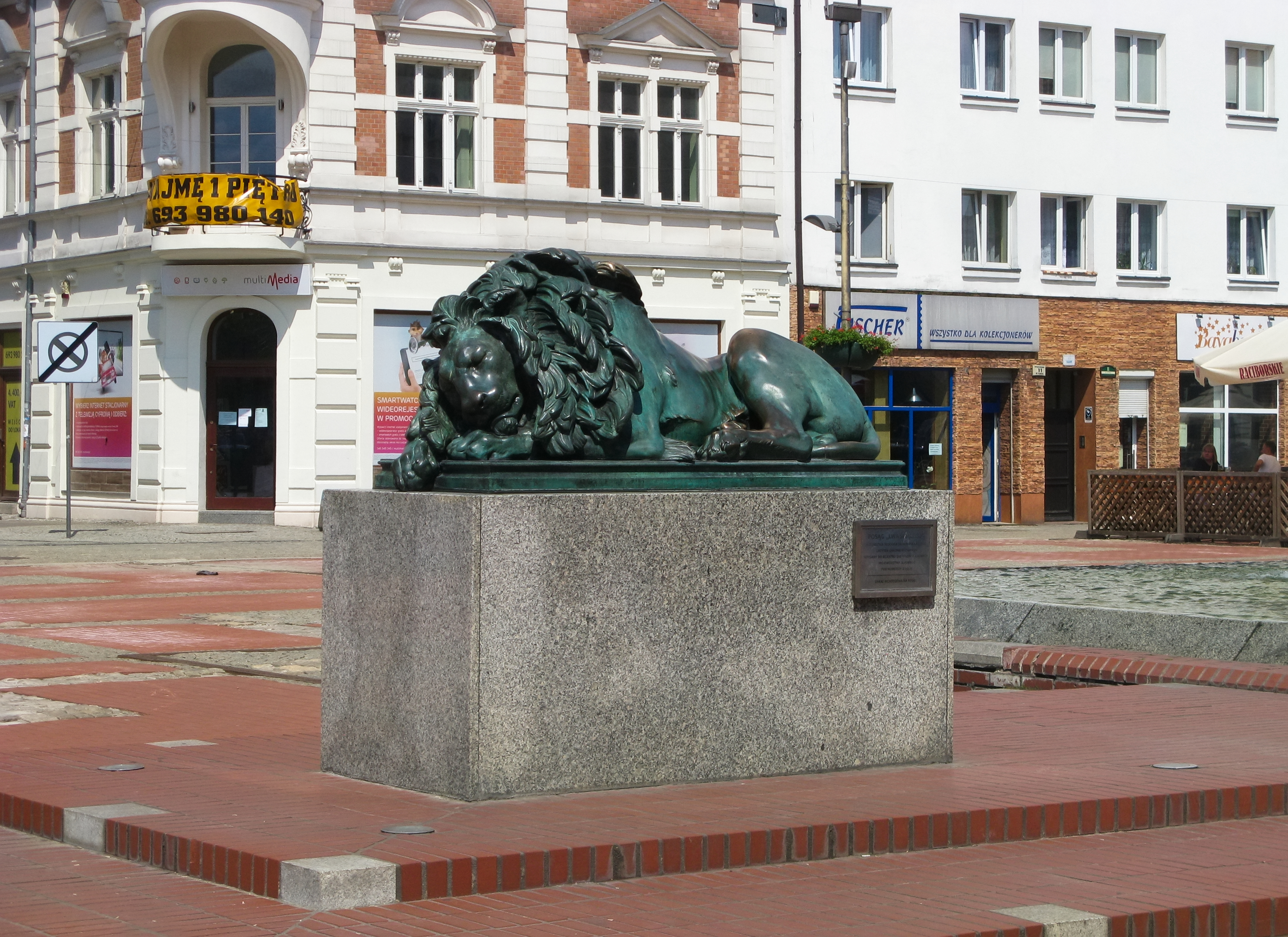
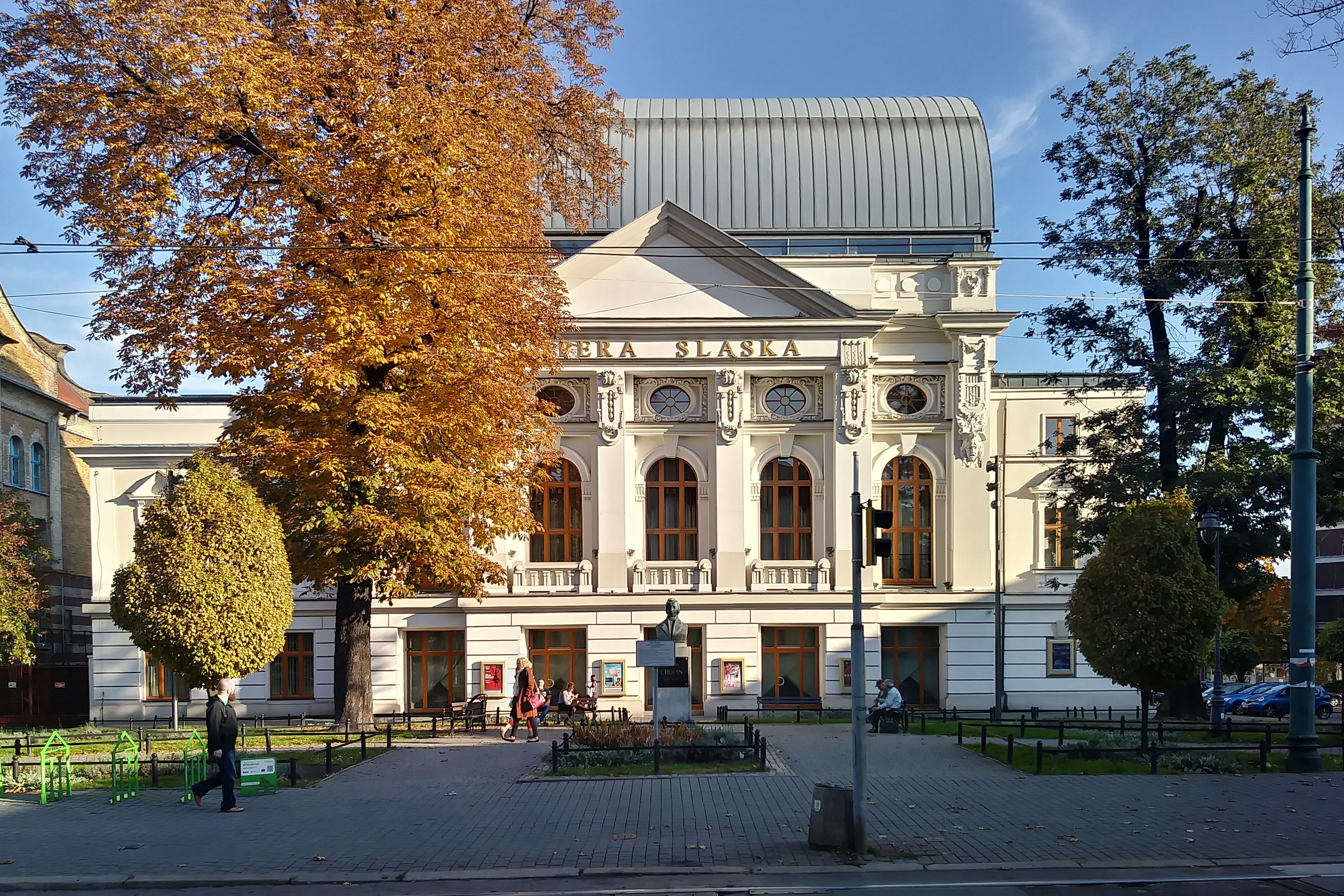
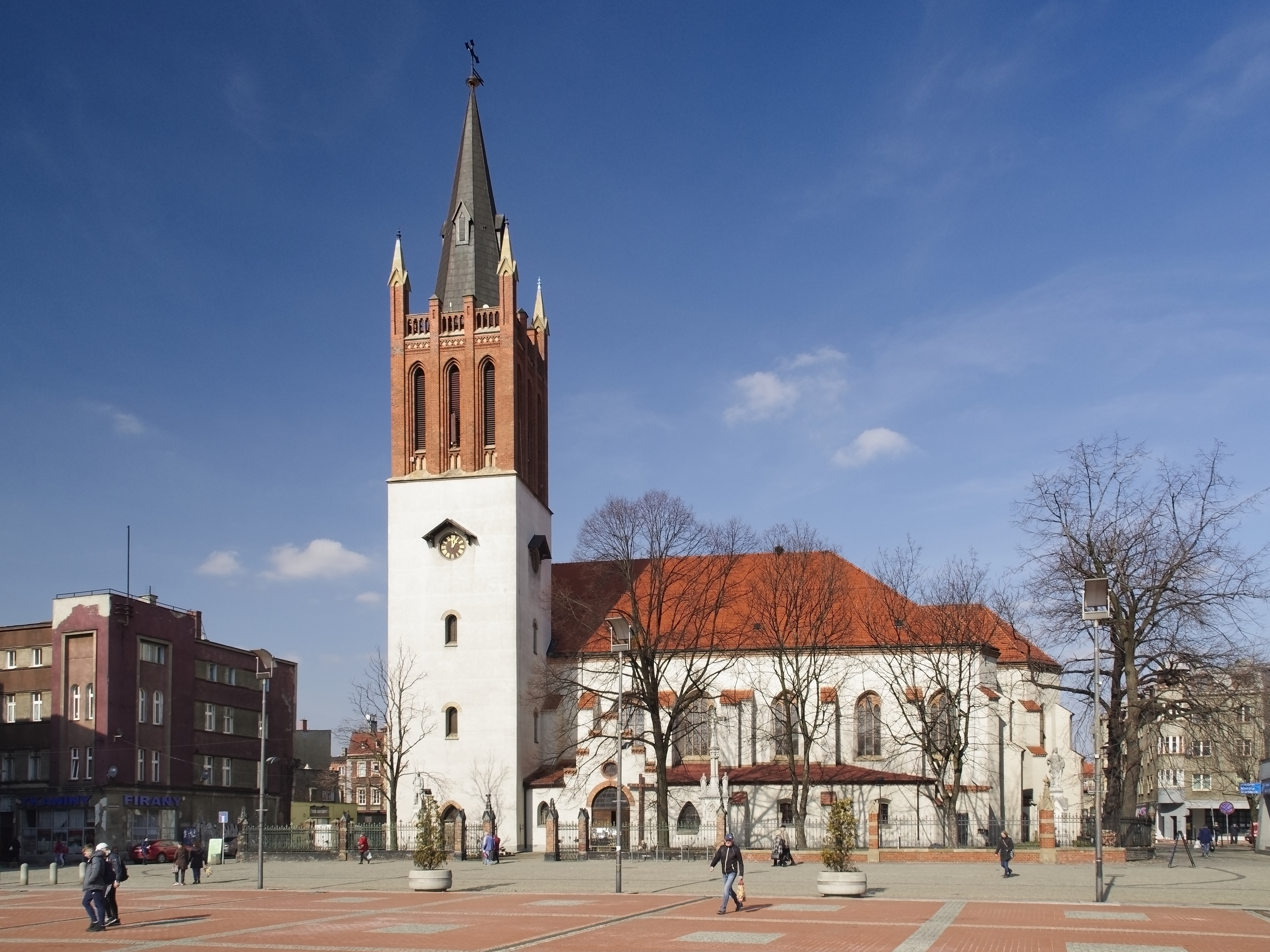
- Aerial view of the city center Market Square Sleeping Lion Silesian Opera St. Mary church

- Flag Coat of arms

- Location within Poland
- Coordinates: 50°20′54″N 18°54′56″E
- Country: Poland
- Voivodeship: Silesian
- County: city county
- Established: 12th century
- City rights: 1254

Government
  - City mayor: Mariusz Wołosz (KO)

Area
  - City county: 69.44 km^{2} (26.81 sq mi)
- Highest elevation: 330 m (1,080 ft)
- Lowest elevation: 249 m (817 ft)

Population (31 December 2021)
  - City county: 161,139 ▼ (23rd)
  - Density: 2,321/km^{2} (6,010/sq mi)
  - Urban: 2,710,397
  - Metro: 5,294,000
- Time zone: UTC+1 (CET)
  - Summer (DST): UTC+2 (CEST)
- Postal code: 41-900–41-936
- Area code: +48 32
- Car plates: SY
- Primary airport: Katowice Airport
- Website: www.bytom.pl

Bytom (Polish pronunciation: [ˈbɨtɔm]; Silesian: Bytōm, Bytōń, German: Beuthen O.S.) is a city in Upper Silesia, in southern Poland. Located in the Silesian Voivodeship, the city is 7 km (4 mi) northwest of Katowice, the regional capital.

It is one of the oldest cities in the Upper Silesia, and the former seat of the Piast dukes of the Duchy of Bytom. Until 1532, it was in the hands of the Piast dynasty, then it belonged to the Hohenzollern dynasty. After 1623 it was a state country in the hands of the Donnersmarck family. From 1742 to 1945 the town was within the borders of Prussia and Germany, and played an important role as an economic and administrative centre of the local industrial region. Until the outbreak of World War II, it was the main centre of national, social, cultural and publishing organisations fighting to preserve Polish identity in Upper Silesia. In the interbellum and during World War II, local Poles and Jews faced persecution by Germany.

After the war, decades of the Polish People's Republic were characterized by a constant emphasis on the development of heavy industry, which deeply polluted and degraded Bytom. After 1989, the city experienced a socio-economic decline. The population has also been rapidly declining since 1999. However, it is an important place in the cultural, entertainment, and industrial map of the region. Bytom is home to the Silesian Opera, the Upper Silesian Museum, and part of the Tarnowskie Góry Lead-Silver-Zinc Mine and its Underground Water Management System, a UNESCO World Heritage Site and Historic Monument of Poland. The city is also known as the home of Polonia Bytom, a successful football and ice hockey club.

== Geography ==
=== Geology ===
The bedrock of the Upland of Miechowice consists primarily of sandstones and slates. The rocks are punctuated with abundant natural resources of coal and iron ore from the Carboniferous period. In the north part of the upland, in the Bytom basin lays the broad range of the triassic rocks, from sandstones to limestones, with rich ore, zinc and lead reserves. The upper layer is composed of clay, sand and gravel.

== Coat of arms ==
One half of the coat of arms of Bytom depicts a miner mining coal, while the other half presents a yellow eagle on the blue field – the symbol of Upper Silesia.

== History ==
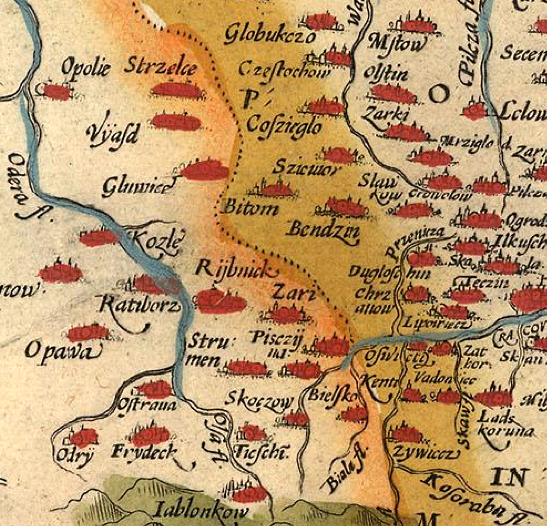
Fragment of a map from 1592 with Bitom marked

Bytom is one of the oldest cities of Upper Silesia, originally recorded as Bitom in 1136, when it was part of the Medieval Kingdom of Poland. Archaeological discoveries have shown that there was a fortified settlement (a gród) here, probably founded by the Polish King Bolesław I the Brave in the early 11th century.

After the fragmentation of Poland in 1138, Bytom became part of the Seniorate Province, as it was still considered part of historic Lesser Poland. In 1177 it became part of the Silesian province of Poland, and remained within historic Silesia since. Bytom received city rights from Prince Władysław in 1254 with its first centrally located market square. The city of Bytom benefited economically from its location on a trade route linking Kraków with Silesia from east to west, and Hungary with Moravia and Greater Poland from north to south. The first Roman Catholic Church of the Virgin Mary was built in 1231. In 1259 Bytom was raided by the Mongols. The Duchy of Opole was split and in 1281 Bytom became a separate duchy, since 1289 under overlordship of the Kingdom of Bohemia. Bytom Castle was built in around 1284-1299 and demolished in later centuries. The duchy existed until 1498, when it was re-integrated with the Piast-ruled Duchy of Opole. In 1460 a Polish–Czech friendship treaty was signed in Bytom. Due to German settlers coming to the area, the city was being Germanized.

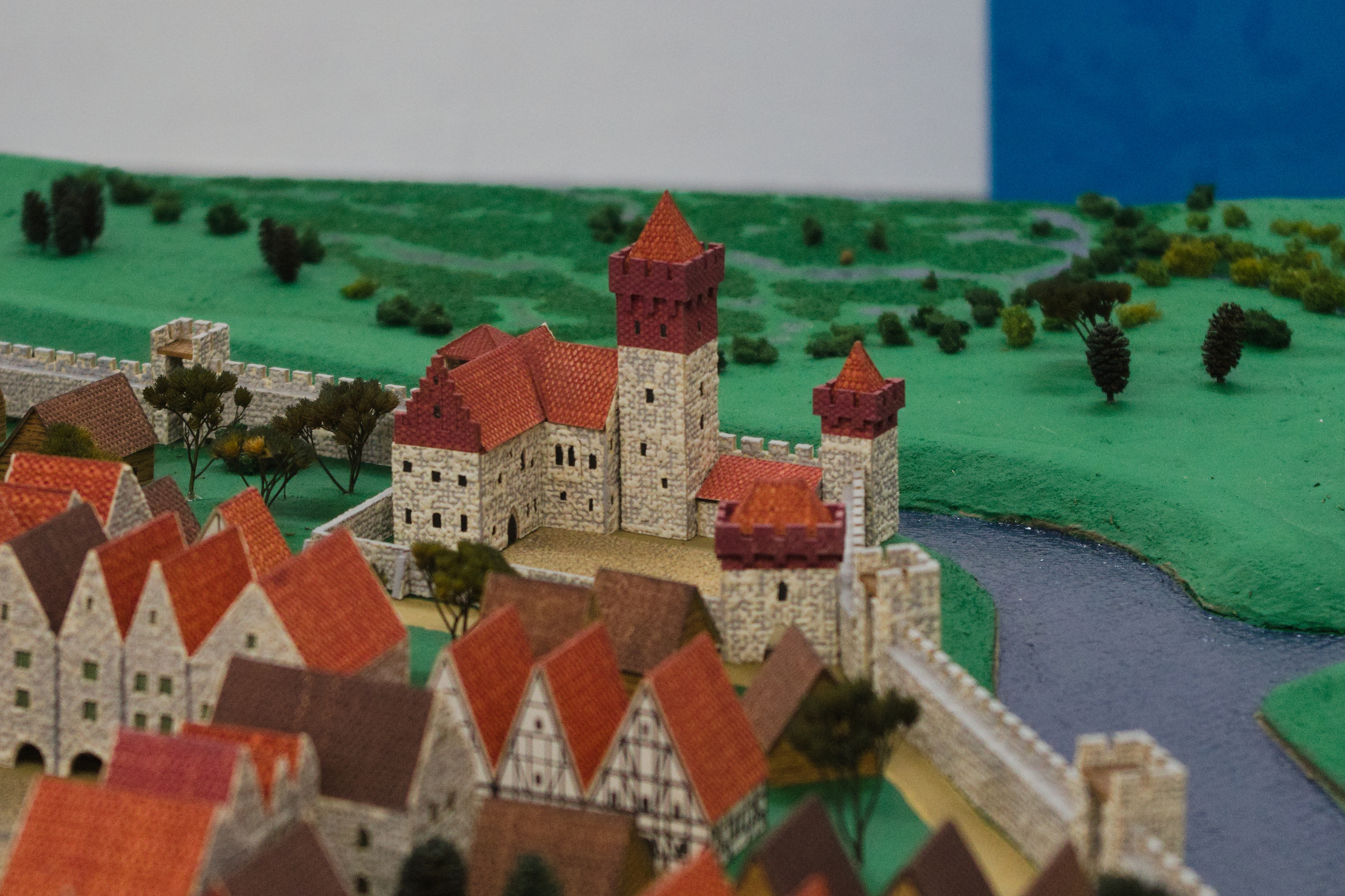
Model of the medieval Piast castle in Bytom

It came under the control of the Habsburg monarchy of Austria in 1526, which increased the influence of the German language. In 1683, Polish King John III Sobieski and his wife Queen Marie Casimire, visited the city, greeted by the townspeople and clergy, on the king's way to the Battle of Vienna. The city became part of the Kingdom of Prussia in 1742 during the Silesian Wars and part of the German Empire in 1871. In the 19th and the first part of the 20th centuries, the city rapidly grew and industrialized.

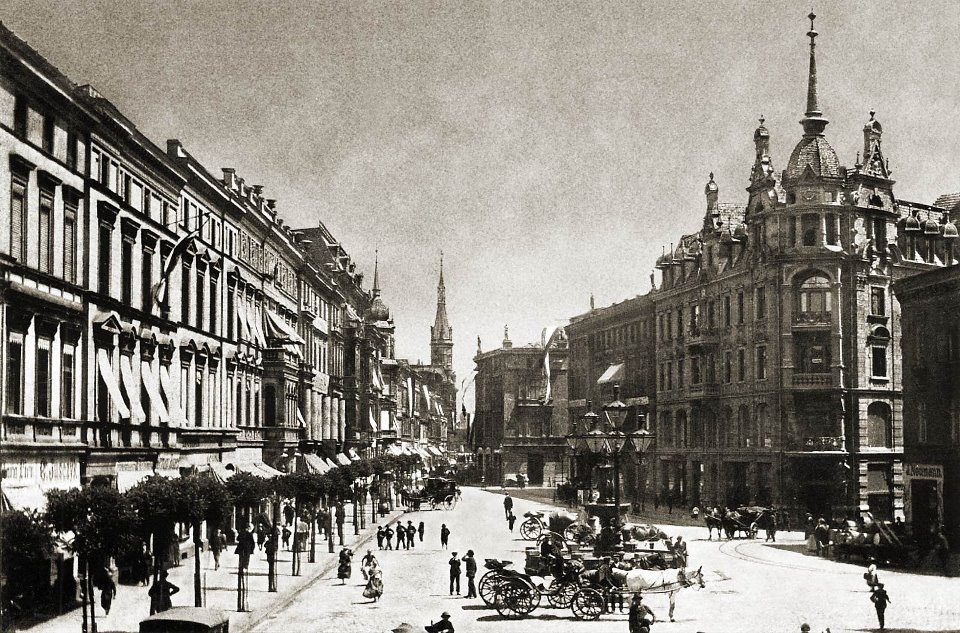
Kosciuszko Square in the 1890s

Bytom was one of the main centers of Polish resistance against Germanization in Upper Silesia in the 19th century, up until the mid-20th century. Polish social, political and cultural organizations were formed and operated here. From 1848, the newspaper Dziennik Górnośląski was published here. Poles smuggled large amounts of gunpowder through the city to the Russian Partition of Poland during the January Uprising in 1863. Further Polish newspapers were published in the city, Katolik since 1885, following relocation from nearby Chorzów, Gwiazda Górnoszlązka since 1889 following relocation from nearby Piekary (relocated to Chorzów in 1893), and Dziennik Śląski since 1898 (relocated to Chorzów in 1911). According to the Prussian census of 1905, the city had a population of 60,273, of which 59% spoke German, 38% spoke Polish and 3% were bilingual. In 1895, a local branch of the "Sokół" Polish Gymnastic Society was established as one of the first in Silesia. The German authorities harassed Sokół members and tenants, the German police conducted searches of offices and apartments, and the German courts imposed fines and prison sentences. In 1900, the first Polish Women's Society in Silesia was established, which also organized secret lectures on Polish history and literature and Polish sing-alongs, for which its members were persecuted by the Prussian police. In 1904, the first Polish women's rally in Silesia took place in the city, and in 1906, a Polish Reading Room for Women was established. During the Silesian uprisings, in 1919–1920, Polish football clubs Poniatowski Szombierki and Polonia Bytom were founded, which later on, in post-World War II Poland both won the national championship.

In the post-World War I Upper Silesian plebiscite of 1921, 74.7% of the votes in the city were for Germany, and 25.3% were for Poland. In the present-day districts of Górniki, Stolarzowice, Sucha Góra, Miechowice, Szombierki, Karb, Łagiewniki and Rozbark 88.5%, 86.0%, 82.7%, 71.9%, 71.1%, 69.4%, 57.9% and 54.5%, respectively, voted for Poland, whereas in Bobrek 51.7% voted for Germany, yet only Sucha Góra was reintegrated with Poland.

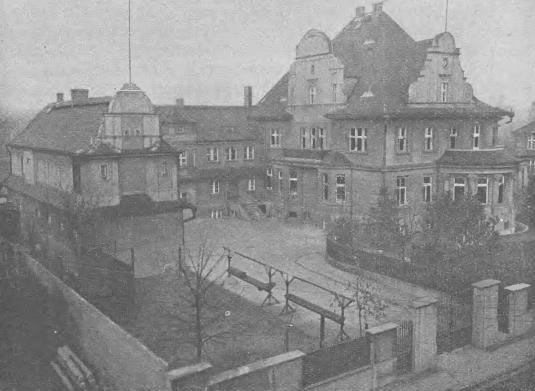
Dormitory of the Polish Gymnasium in the 1930s

In the interwar period, Bytom was one of two cities (alongside Kwidzyn) in Germany, in which a Polish gymnasium was allowed to operate. In 1923 a branch of the Union of Poles in Germany was established in Bytom. There was also a Polish preschool, two scout troops and a Polish bank. In a secret Sicherheitsdienst report from 1934, Bytom was named one of the main centers of the Polish movement in western Upper Silesia. Polish activists were persecuted since 1937. The Bytom Synagogue was burned down by Nazi German SS and SA troopers during the Kristallnacht on 9–10 November 1938. Before 1939, the town, along with Gleiwitz (now Gliwice), was at the southeastern tip of German Silesia.

=== World War II and post-war period ===
During the German invasion of Poland, which started World War II, the Germans carried out mass arrests of local Poles. On September 1, 1939, the day of the outbreak of the war, Adam Bożek, the chairman of the Upper Silesian district of the Union of Poles in Germany, was arrested in Bytom and then deported to the Dachau concentration camp. The Germans carried out searches in the Polish gymnasium and the local Polish community centre, 20 Polish activists were arrested on September 4, 1939, then released and arrested again a few days later to be deported to the Buchenwald concentration camp. Also three Polish teachers, who had not yet fled, were arrested, while the assets of the Polish bank were confiscated. The Einsatzgruppe I entered the city on September 6, 1939, to commit atrocities against Poles. Many Poles were conscripted to the Wehrmacht and died on various war fronts, including 92 former students of the Polish gymnasium. The Jewish community was liquidated via the first ever Holocaust transport to be exterminated at Auschwitz-Birkenau.

The Germans operated a Nazi prison in the city with a forced labour subcamp in the present-day Karb district. There were also multiple forced labour camps within the present-day city limits, including six subcamps of the Stalag VIII-B/344 prisoner-of-war camp. Dozens of prisoners were sent from the Nazi prison on a death march westwards towards Głubczyce. The Polish resistance carried out industrial sabotage and, on 20 January 1944, caused an explosion at the local steelworks, destroying 440 tonnes of steel.

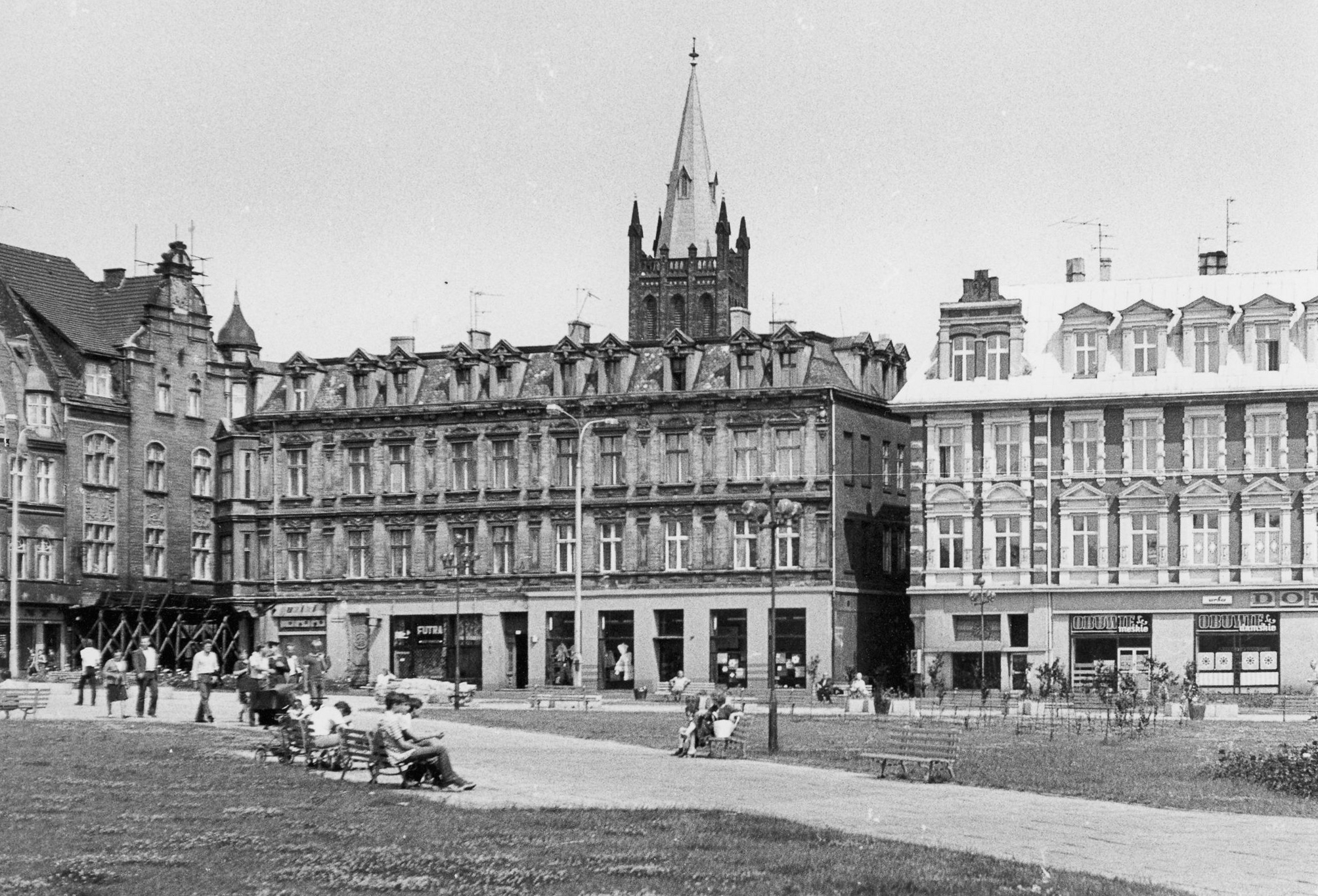
Bytom in the 1970s

In January 1945, the city was captured by the Soviet Red Army. Soviet troops then committed massacres of civilians in the present-day district of Miechowice and Stolarzowice, killing some 400 and 70 people, respectively, and raped many women. In 1945, the city was transferred to Poland as a result of the Potsdam Conference. Its German population was largely expelled by the Soviet Army and the remaining indigenous Polish inhabitants were joined mostly by Poles repatriated from the eastern provinces annexed by the Soviets.

In 2017, the Tarnowskie Góry Lead-Silver-Zinc Mine and its Underground Water Management System, located mostly in the neighboring city of Tarnowskie Góry, but also partly in Bytom, was included on the UNESCO World Heritage List.

== Districts ==
Districts of Bytom

The city of Bytom is divided into 12 districts (Polish: Dzielnice), year of inclusion within the city limits in brackets:

- Śródmieście (lit. city centre/downtown)
- Rozbark (1927)
- Bobrek (1951)
- Karb (1951)
- Łagiewniki (1951)
- Miechowice (1951)
- Szombierki (1951)
- Górniki (1975)
- Osiedle gen. Jerzego Ziętka (1975), also known as Sójcze Wzgórze
- Stolarzowice (1975)
- Stroszek (1975)
- Sucha Góra (1975)

Radzionków with Rojca (currently a district of Radzionków) were located within the city limits of Bytom from 1975 until 1997. Somehow there is (probably) autonomic district named "Vitor" in South Stroszek.

== Economy ==
Agora Bytom shopping centre

Trade is one of the main pillars of the economy of Bytom. Being a city with long traditions of commercial trade, Bytom is fulfilling its new postindustrial role. In the centre of Bytom, and mainly around Station Street and the Market Square, is the largest concentration of registered merchants in the county.

In 2007, Bytom and its neighbours created the Upper Silesian Metropolitan Union, the largest urban centre in Poland. The Union was superseded by Metropolis GZM in 2018.

== Public transport ==
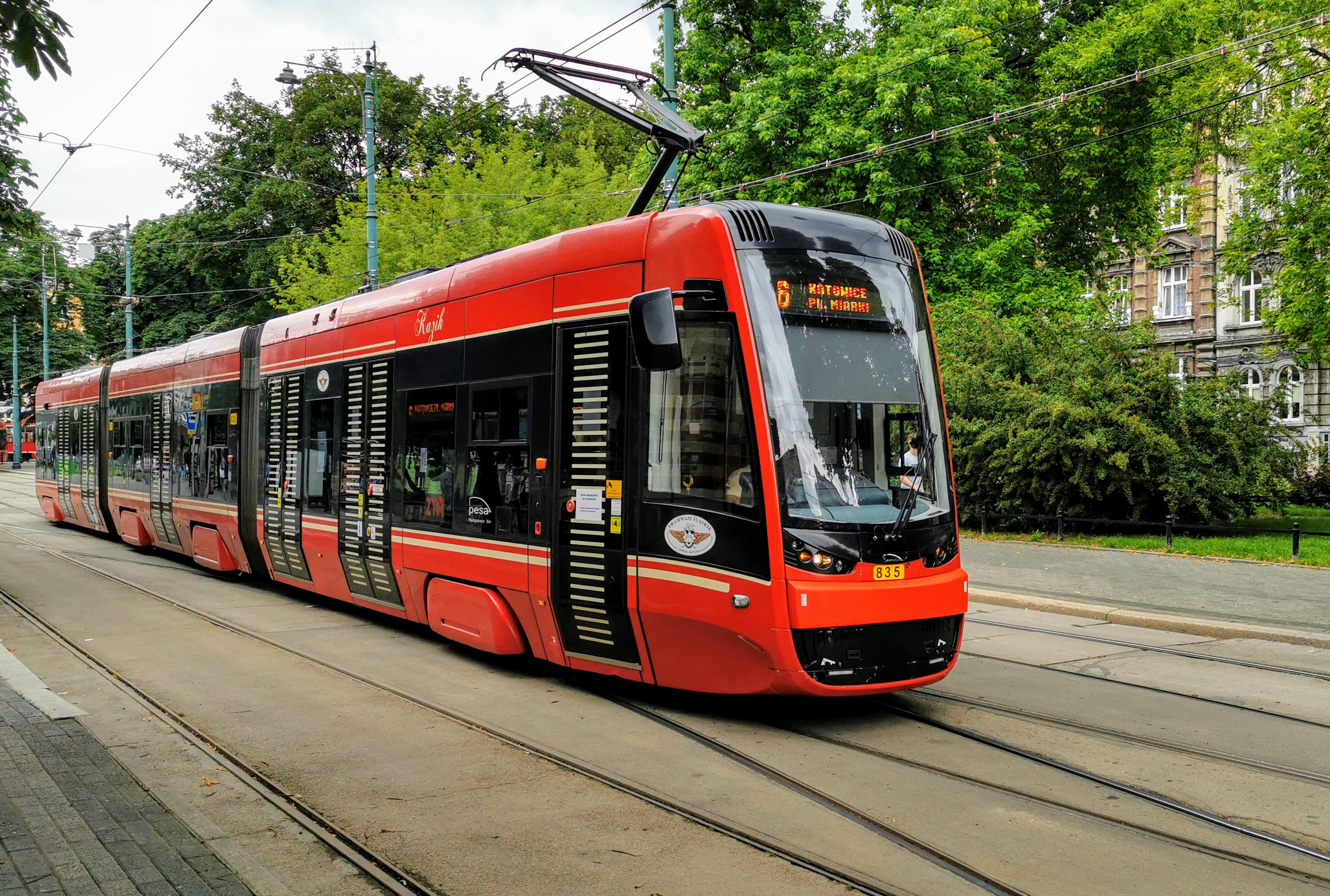
A Pesa Twist tram in Bytom

The tram routes are operated by Silesian Interurbans Tramwaje Śląskie S.A.

== Demographics ==
Historical population

| Year | Pop. | ±% |
|---|---|---|
| 1910 | 67,718 | — |
| 1925 | 62,543 | −7.6% |
| 1933 | 99,352 | +58.9% |
| 1939 | 101,084 | +1.7% |
| 1950 | 173,955 | +72.1% |
| 1960 | 182,578 | +5.0% |

| Year | Pop. | ±% |
|---|---|---|
| 1970 | 187,500 | +2.7% |
| 1978 | 230,844 | +23.1% |
| 1988 | 228,306 | −1.1% |
| 2002 | 193,546 | −15.2% |
| 2011 | 176,902 | −8.6% |
| 2021 | 153,274 | −13.4% |

== Sport ==
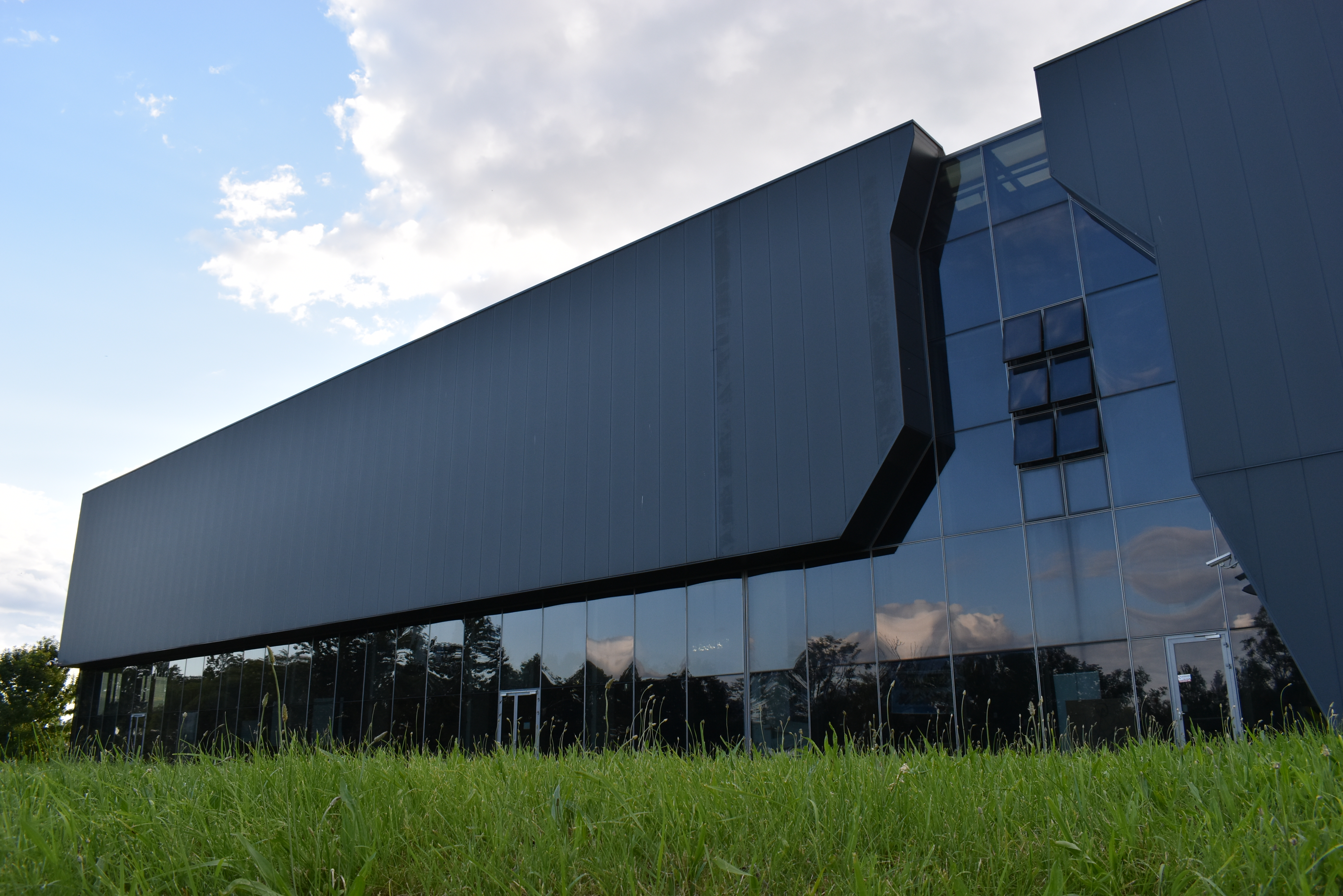
Municipal Sports Hall, home venue of the Polonia Bytom basketball team

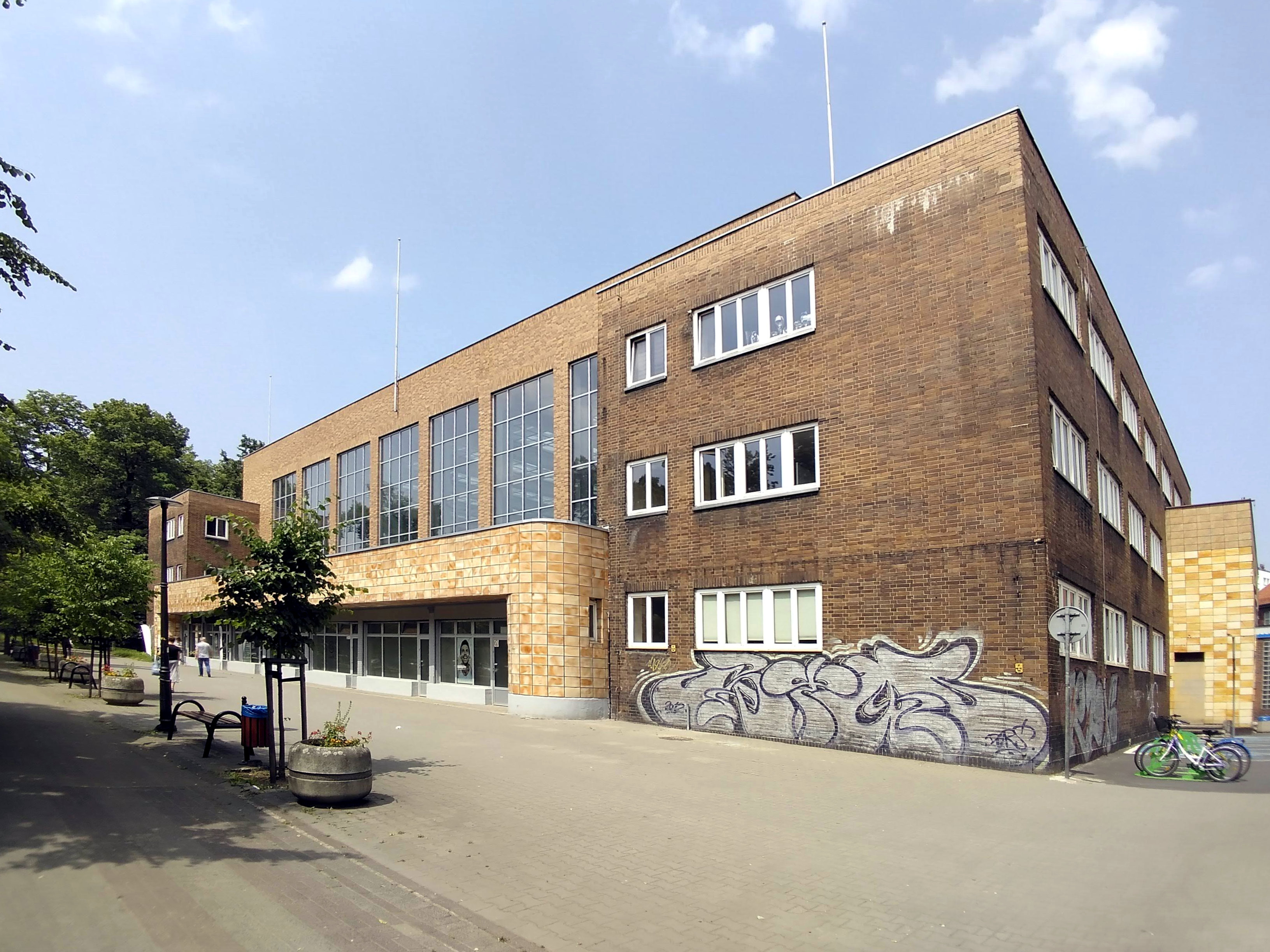
Indoor Swimming Pool, home venue of the Polonia Bytom water polo team

Bytom is home to Polonia Bytom which has football, ice hockey (TMH Polonia Bytom) and basketball teams. The ice hockey team plays in the Polska Hokej Liga, Poland's top division, as of 2026–27, and won six Polish championships to date, most recently in 1991. The football team played in the Ekstraklasa, most recently from 2007 to 2011, winning it twice in 1954 and in 1962. The water polo team of Polonia Bytom plays in the Ekstraklasa, Poland's top division, as of 2026–27, and won five Polish Water Polo Championships to date, most recently in 2020.

The Szombierki district is home to another former Polish football champion Szombierki Bytom which won the title in 1980, and is one of the oldest clubs in the region.

Other areas of the city host football clubs such as Górniki which is home to lower league club Rodło Górniki, founded in 1946.

== Culture ==
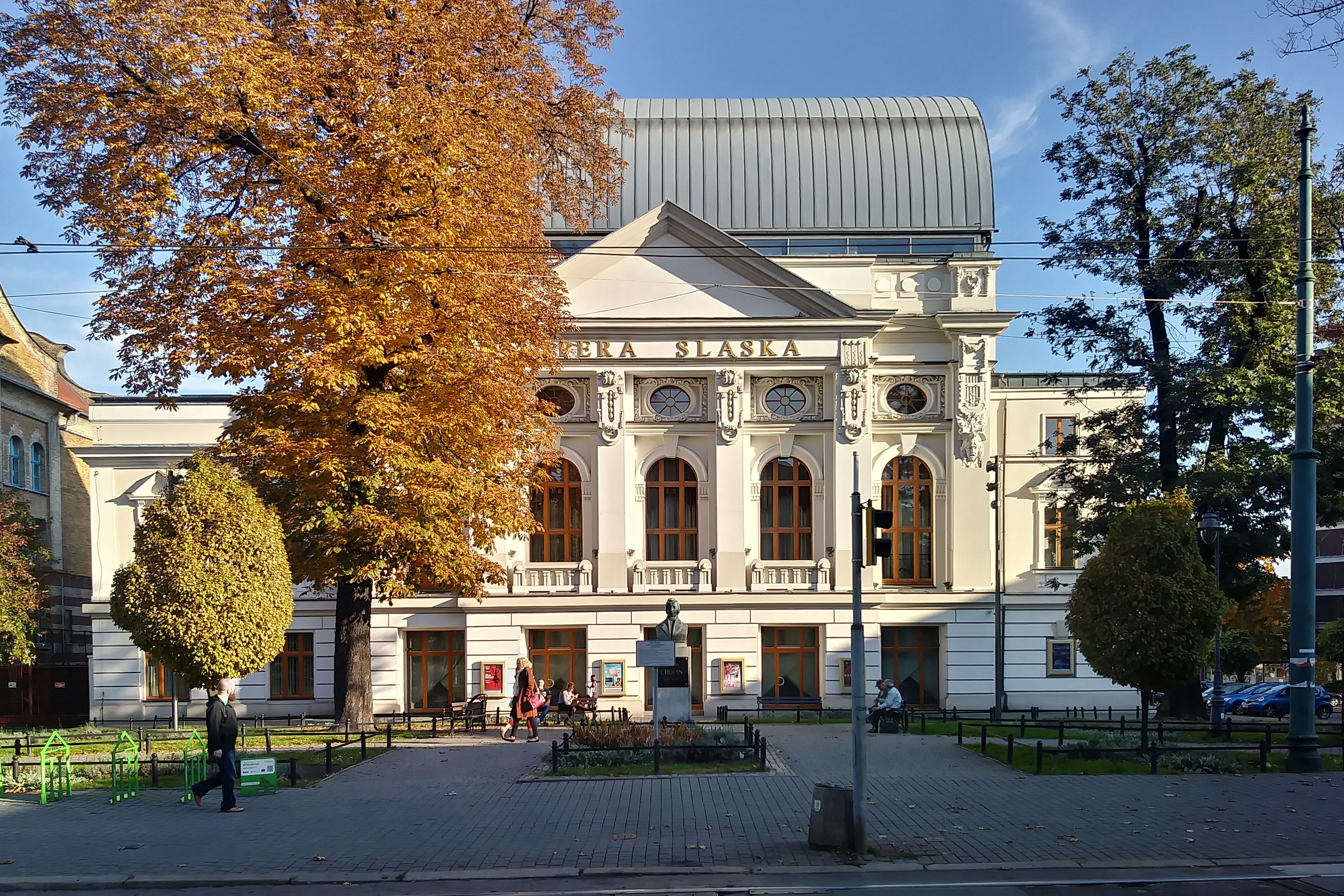
Silesian Opera

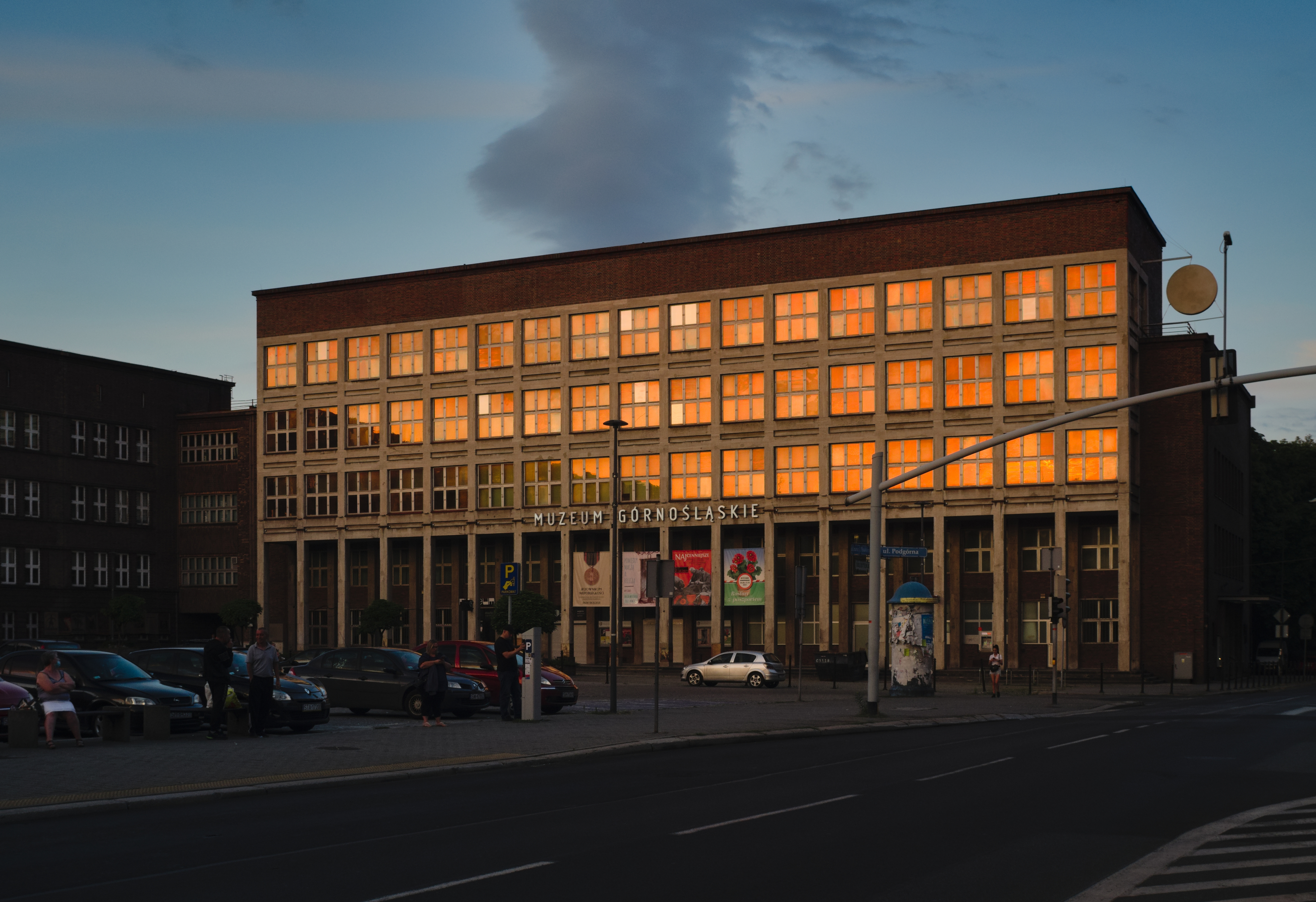
Upper Silesian Museum

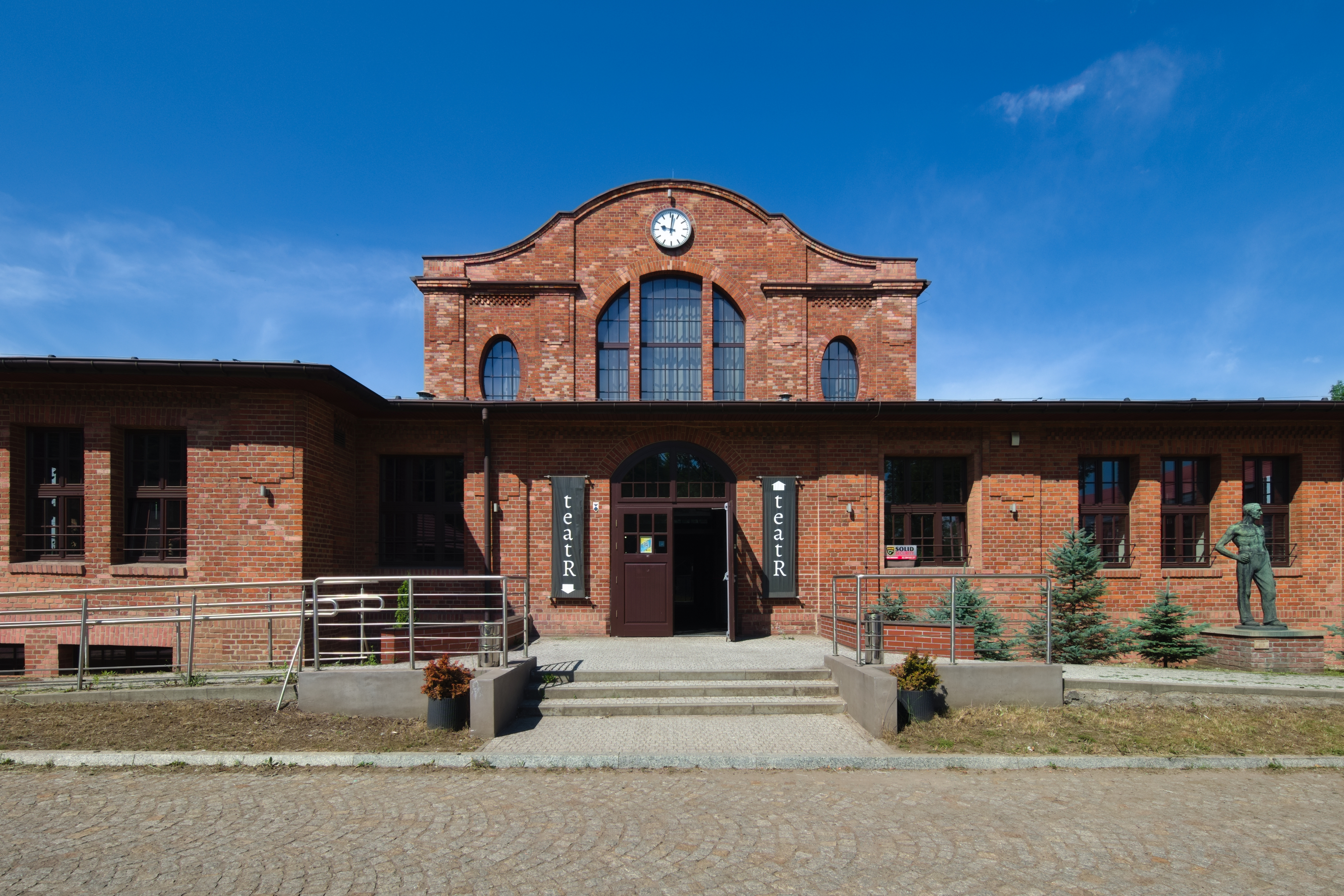
Rozbark Dance Theater

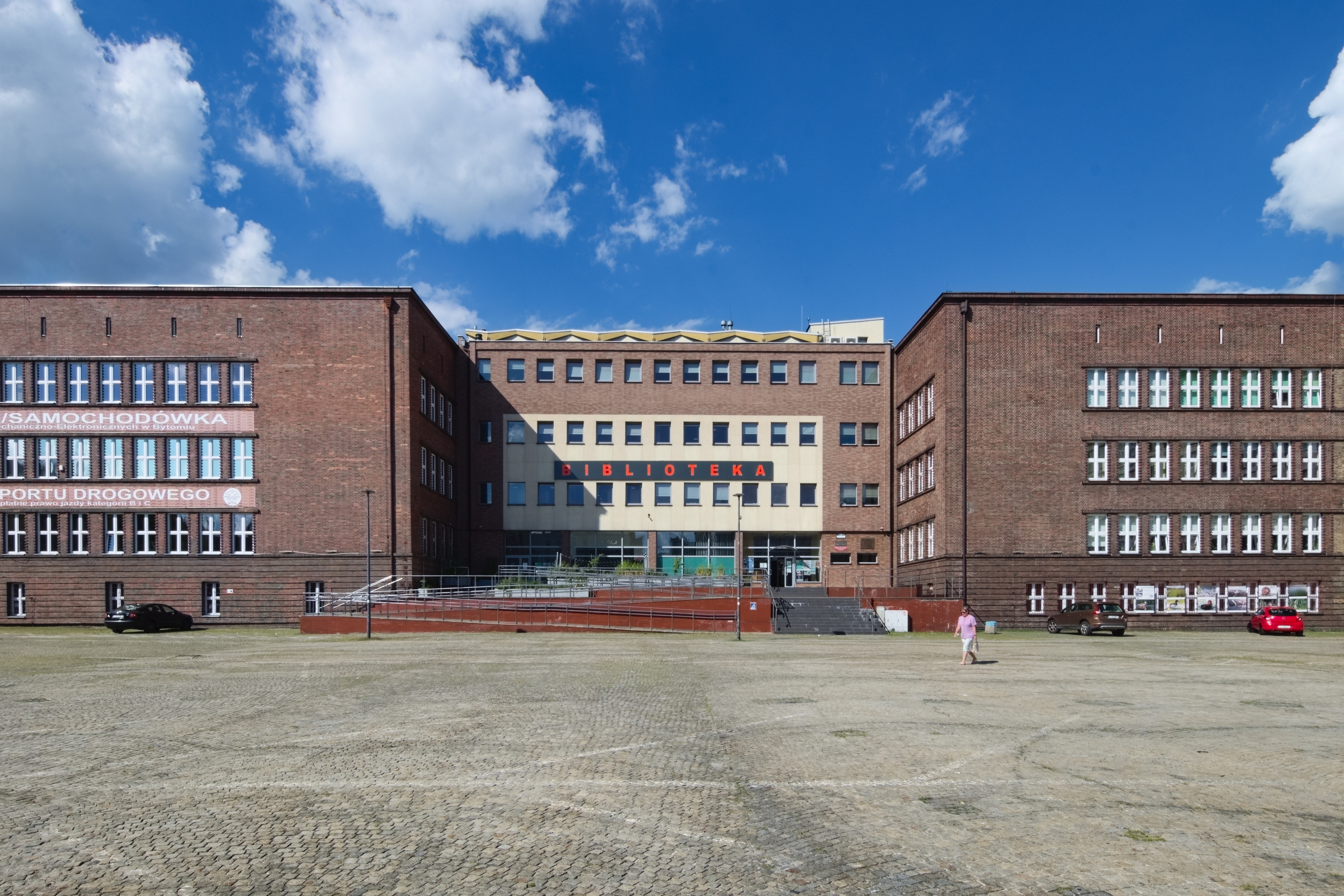
Municipal Public Library

Bytom's cultural venues include:

- Silesian Opera – ul. Moniuszki 21/23
- Miejska Biblioteka Publiczna w Bytomiu (Town's Public Library)
- Rozbark Dance Theatre
- Bytomskie Centrum Kultury (Bytom Cultural Centre)
- Kronika – Center of modern art
- City Choir of St. Grzegorz Wielki
- Muzeum Górnośląskie (Upper Silesian Museum)

Among Bytom's art galleries are: Galeria Sztuki Użytkowej Stalowe Anioły, Galeria "Rotunda" MBP, Galeria "Suplement", Galeria "Pod Czaplą", Galeria "Platforma", Galeria "Pod Szrtychem", Galeria Sztuki "Od Nowa 2", Galeria SPAP "Plastyka" – Galeria "Kolor", Galeria "Stowarzyszenia.Rewolucja.Art.Pl", and Galeria-herbaciarnia "Fanaberia".

Festivals

- Annual International Contemporary Dance Conference and Performance Festival
- Theatromania – Theatre Festival
- Bytom Literary Autumn
- Festival of New Music

== Education ==
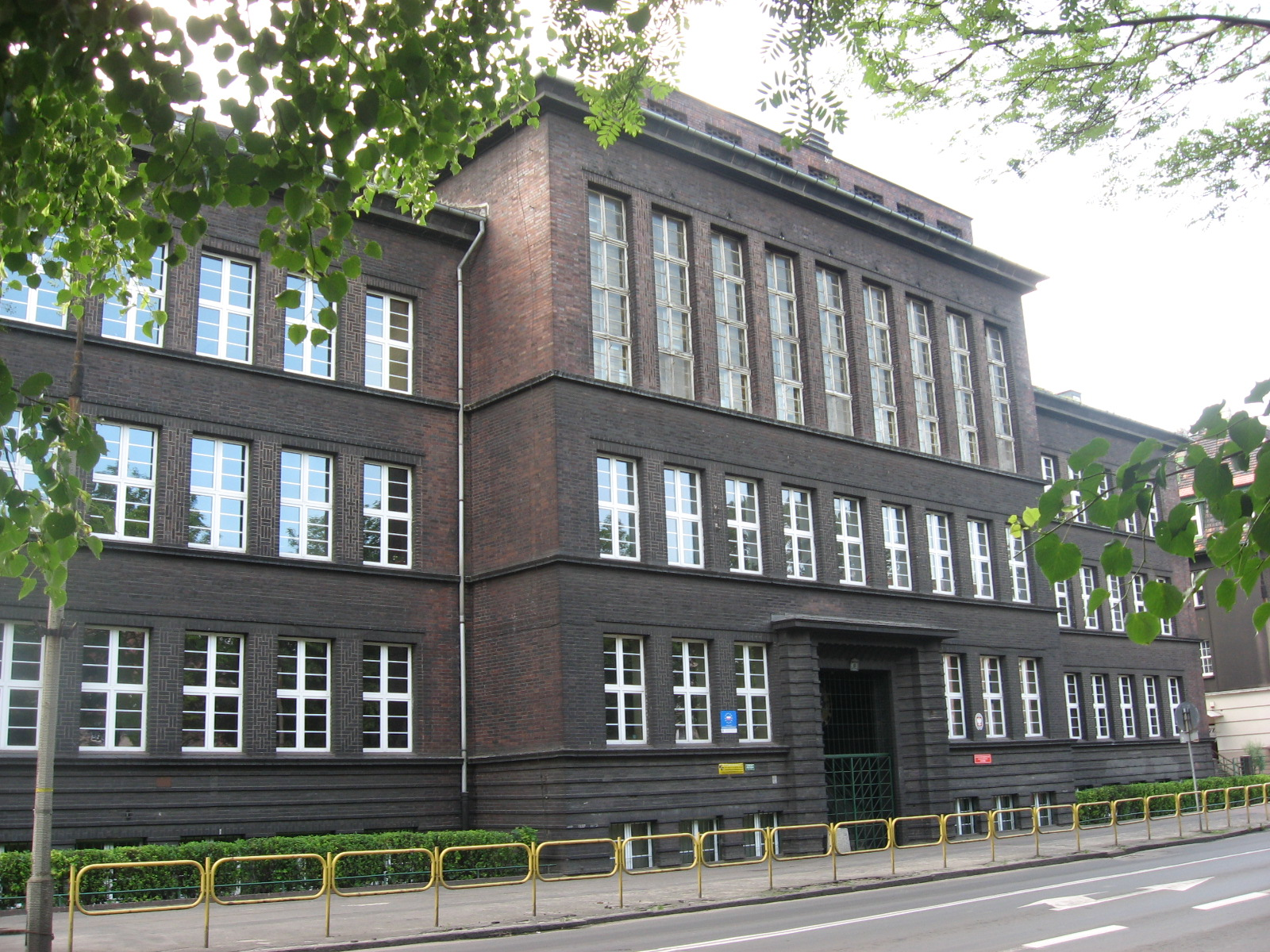
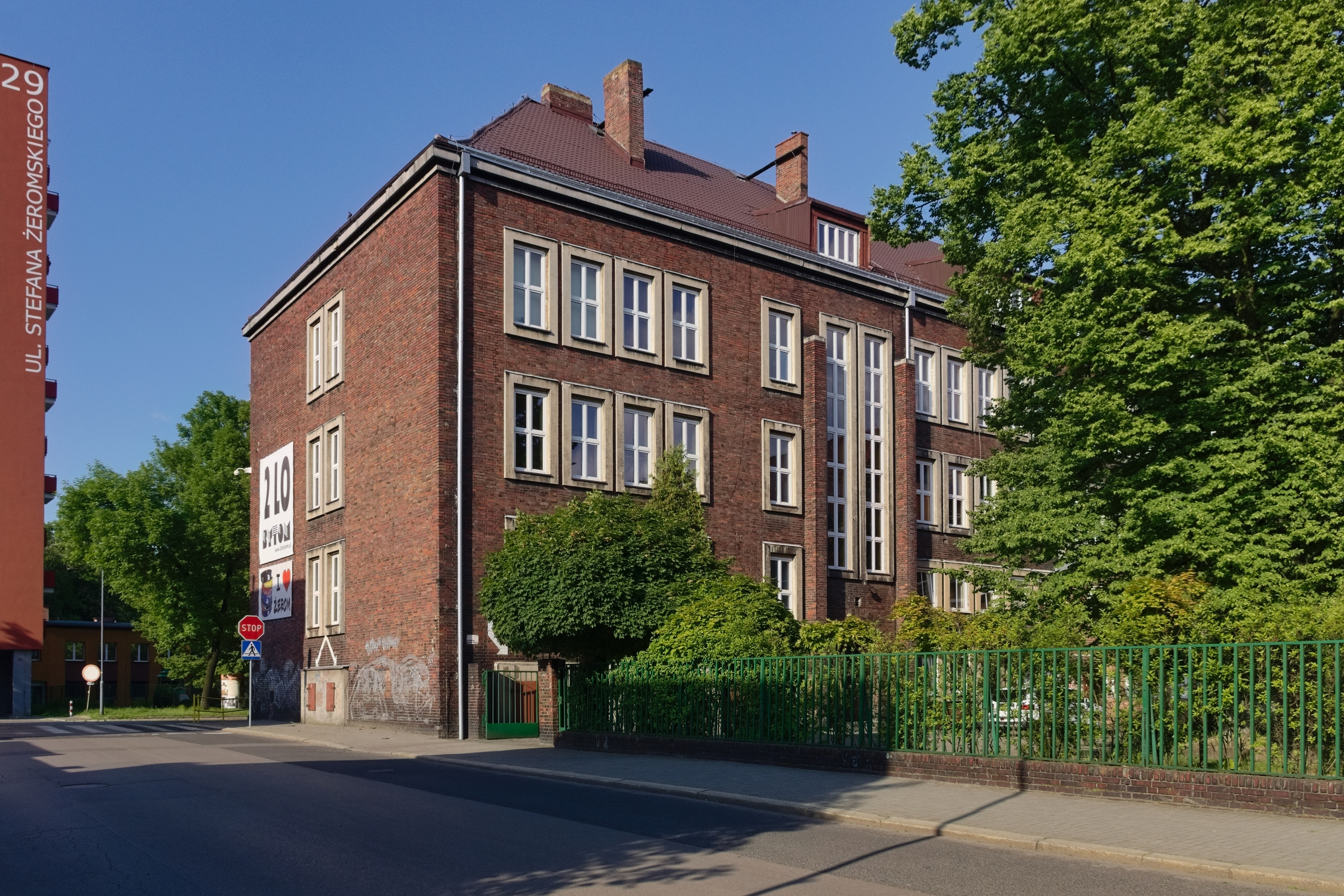
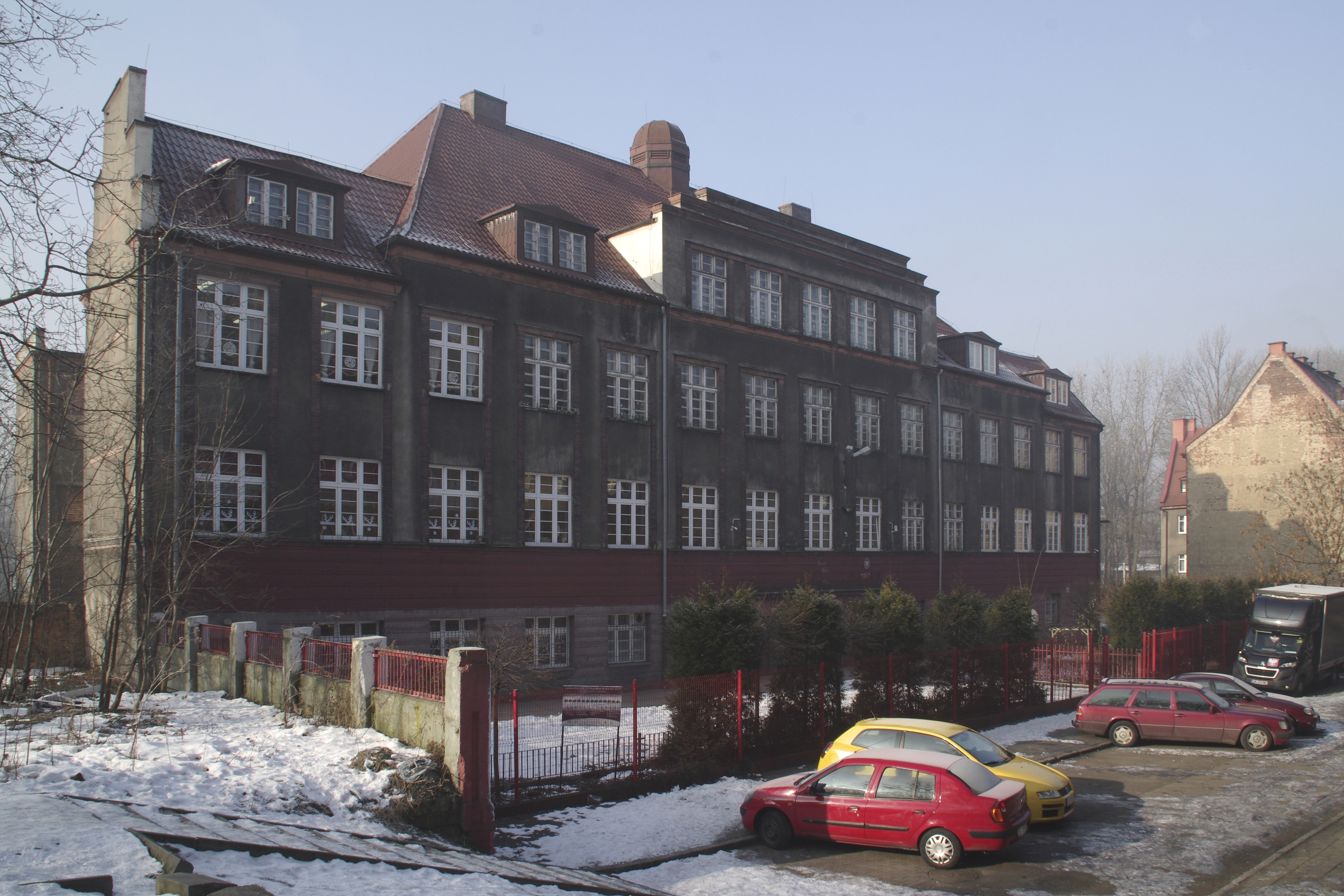
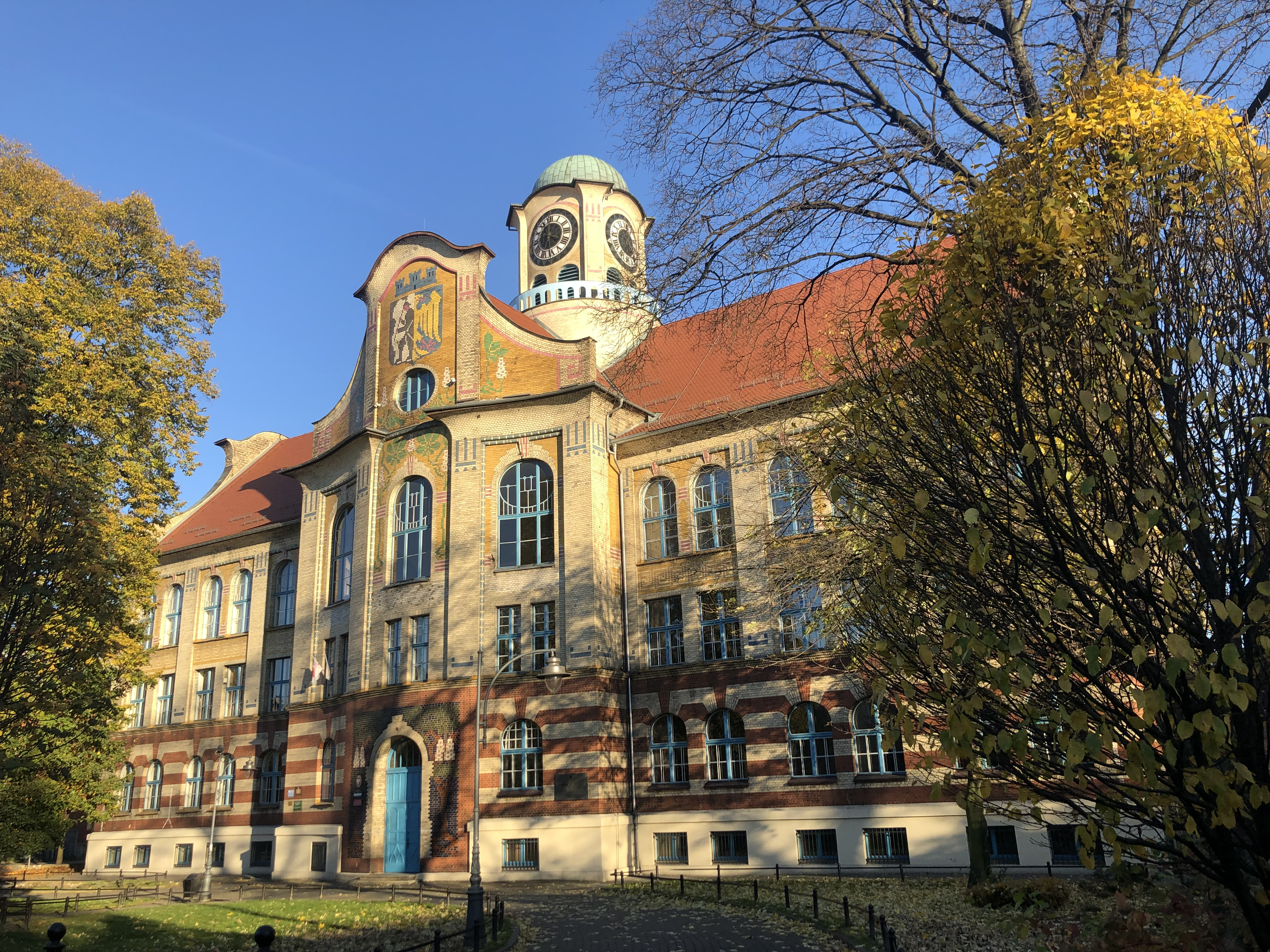
From top, left to right: General education liceums No. 1, 2, 3, and 4.
- The list of Bytom universities includes:
  - Silesian University of Technology – Faculty of Transport
  - Medical University of Silesia
  - Polish Japanese Institute of Information Technology
  - Wyższa Szkoła Ekonomii i Administracji
- Secondary schools:
  - I Liceum Ogólnokształcące im. Jana Smolenia
  - II Liceum Ogólnokształcące im. Stefana Żeromskiego
  - IV Liceum Ogólnokształcące im. Bolesława Chrobrego
  - 21 other secondary schools

== Politics ==
=== Bytom/Gliwice/Zabrze constituency ===
Members of Parliament (Sejm) elected in the 2023 election from Bytom/Gliwice/Zabrze constituency

- Marta Golbik, KO
- Bożena Borys-Szopa, PiS
- Wanda Nowicka, NL
- Wojciech Szarama, PiS
- Marek Gzik, KO
- Tomasz Głogowski, KO
- Jarosław Wieczorek, PiS
- Piotr Strach, TD
- Krystyna Szumilas, KO

== Notable people ==
- Grzegorz Gerwazy Gorczycki (c. 1665–1734), Polish composer and musician
- Heinrich Schulz-Beuthen (1838–1915), German composer
- Siegfried Karfunkelstein (1848–1870), Prussian soldier
- Ernst Gaupp (1865–1916), German anatomist
- Ludwig Halberstädter (1876–1949), radiologist
- Adolf Kober (1879–1958), rabbi and historian
- Maximilian Kaller (1880–1947), bishop of Warmia
- Hermann Kober (1888-1973), Jewish-German mathematician
- Kate Steinitz (1889–1975), German-American artist and art historian
- Fritz Kleiner (1893–1974), German lawyer, businessman and politician
- Hartwig von Ludwiger (1895–1947), German general
- Max Tau (1897–1976), Jewish-German-Norwegian writer, editor and publisher
- Henry J. Leir (1900–1998), American industrialist, financier, and philanthropist
- Friedrich Domin (1902–1961), German film actor
- Rudolf Vogel (1906-1991), German politician (CDU)
- Herbert Büchs (1913–1996), German General
- Józef Kachel (1913–1983), head of the pre-war Polish Scouting Association in Germany
- Hans-Joachim Pancherz (1914–2008), German aviator and test pilot
- Joachim Knychała (1952-1985), Serial killer
- Horst Winter (1914–2001), German-Austrian jazz musician
- Leo Scheffczyk (1920–2005), German theologian and cardinal
- Bent Melchior (1929-2021) Chief Rabbi of Denmark and humanitarian.
- Haim Yavin (born 1932), Israeli news anchor
- Wolfgang Reichmann (1932–1991), German actor
- Reinhard Opitz (1934–1986), German political scientist
- Leo-Ferdinand Henckel von Donnersmarck (1935–2009), German businessman and Catholic lay worker
- Józef Szmidt (born 1935), Polish triple jumper
- Jan Liberda (1936–2020), Polish footballer
- Hans-Jochen Jaschke (1941-2023), German Roman Catholic bishop
- Jan Banaś (born 1943), Polish footballer
- Walter Winkler (1943–2014), Polish footballer
- Zygmunt Anczok (born 1946), Polish footballer
- Jerzy Konikowski (born 1947), chess player
- Leszek Engelking (born 1955), Polish poet, writer, translator and scholar
- Mariusz Wodzicki (born 1956), Polish mathematician
- Waldemar Legień (born 1963), Polish judoka, Olympic champion from Seoul and Barcelona
- Michał Probierz (born 1972), Polish football manager and former football player
- Marcin Suchański (born 1977), Polish footballer
- Marzena Godecki (born 1978), Australian actress
- Dorota Kobiela (born 1978), Polish filmmaker
- Paul Freier (born 1979), German footballer
- Marek Suker (born 1982), Polish footballer
- Gosia Andrzejewicz (born 1984), Polish pop singer
- Martyna Majok (born 1985), Polish-American playwright
- Weronika Murek (born 1989), Polish writer

== Twin towns – sister cities ==
Bytom is twinned with:

- Butte, United States
- Drohobych, Ukraine
- Ormož, Slovenia
- Recklinghausen, Germany
- Vsetín, Czech Republic
- Zhytomyr, Ukraine

== Gallery ==
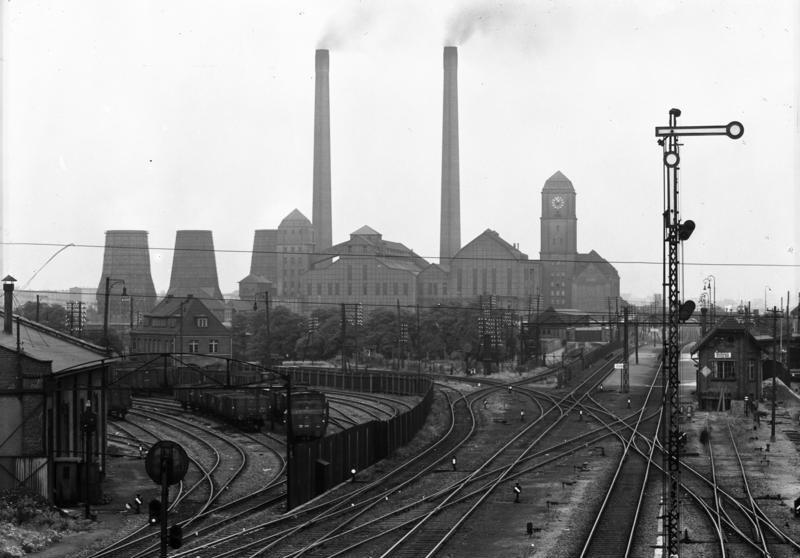
Bobrek power station in the 1930s

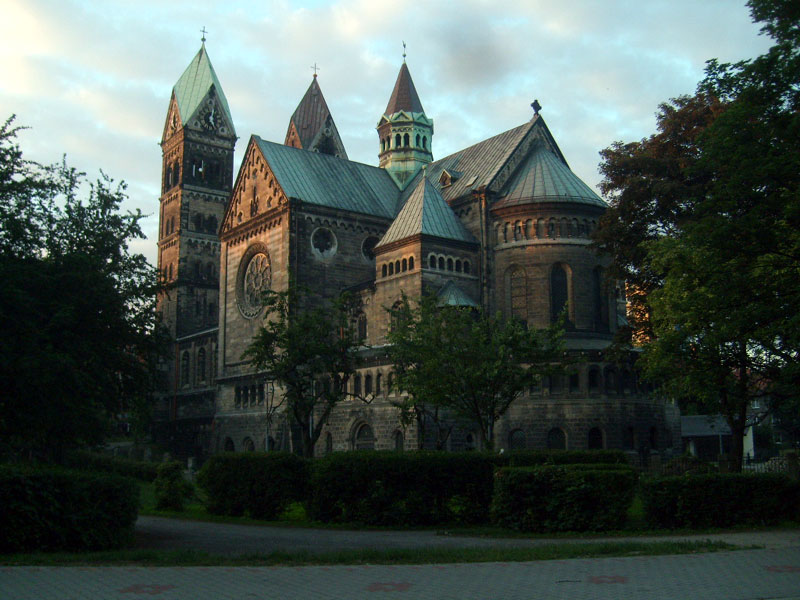
St. Hyacinth's Church – an example of Neo-Romantic architecture in Bytom

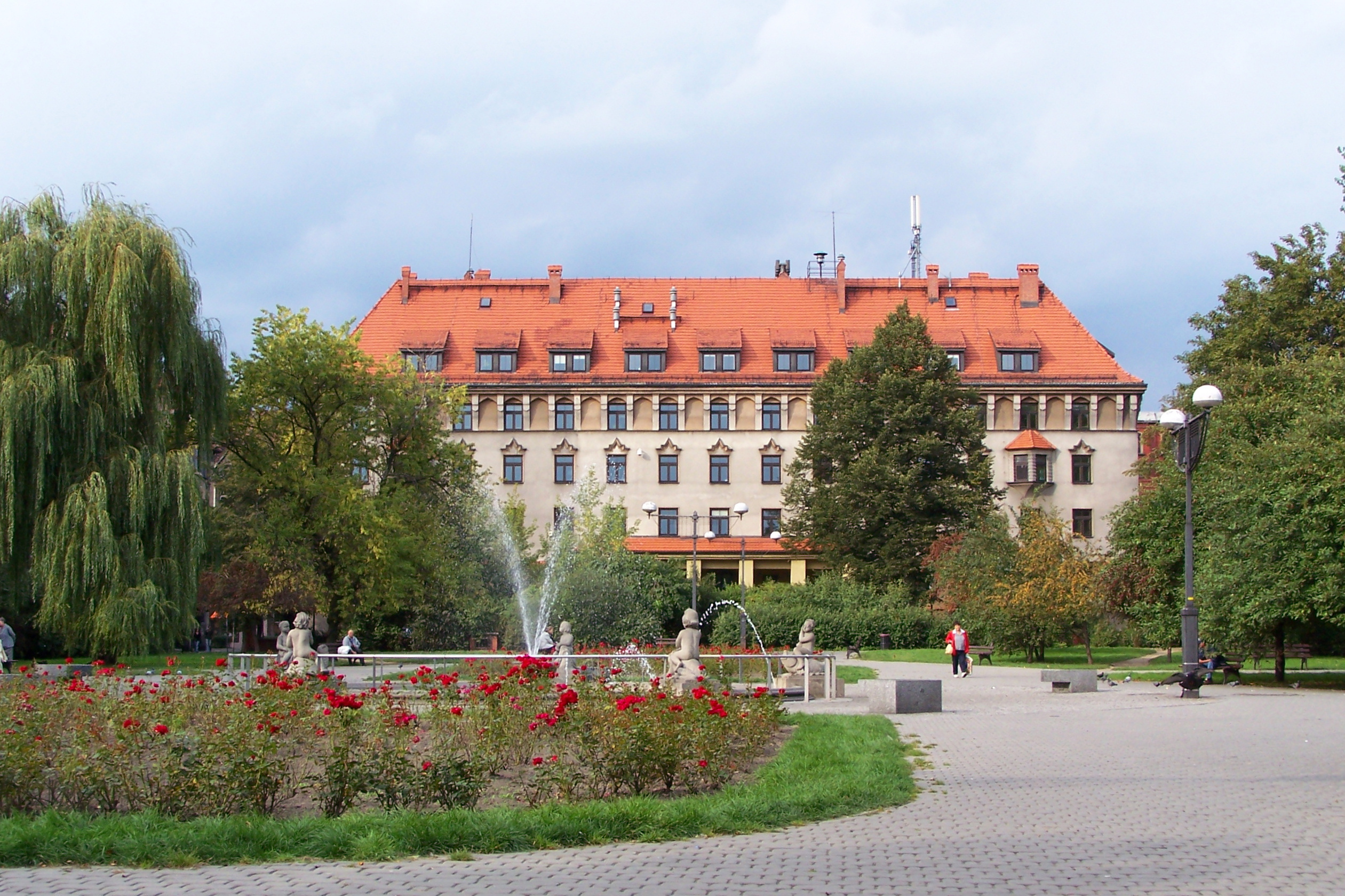
Plac Akademicki – public square

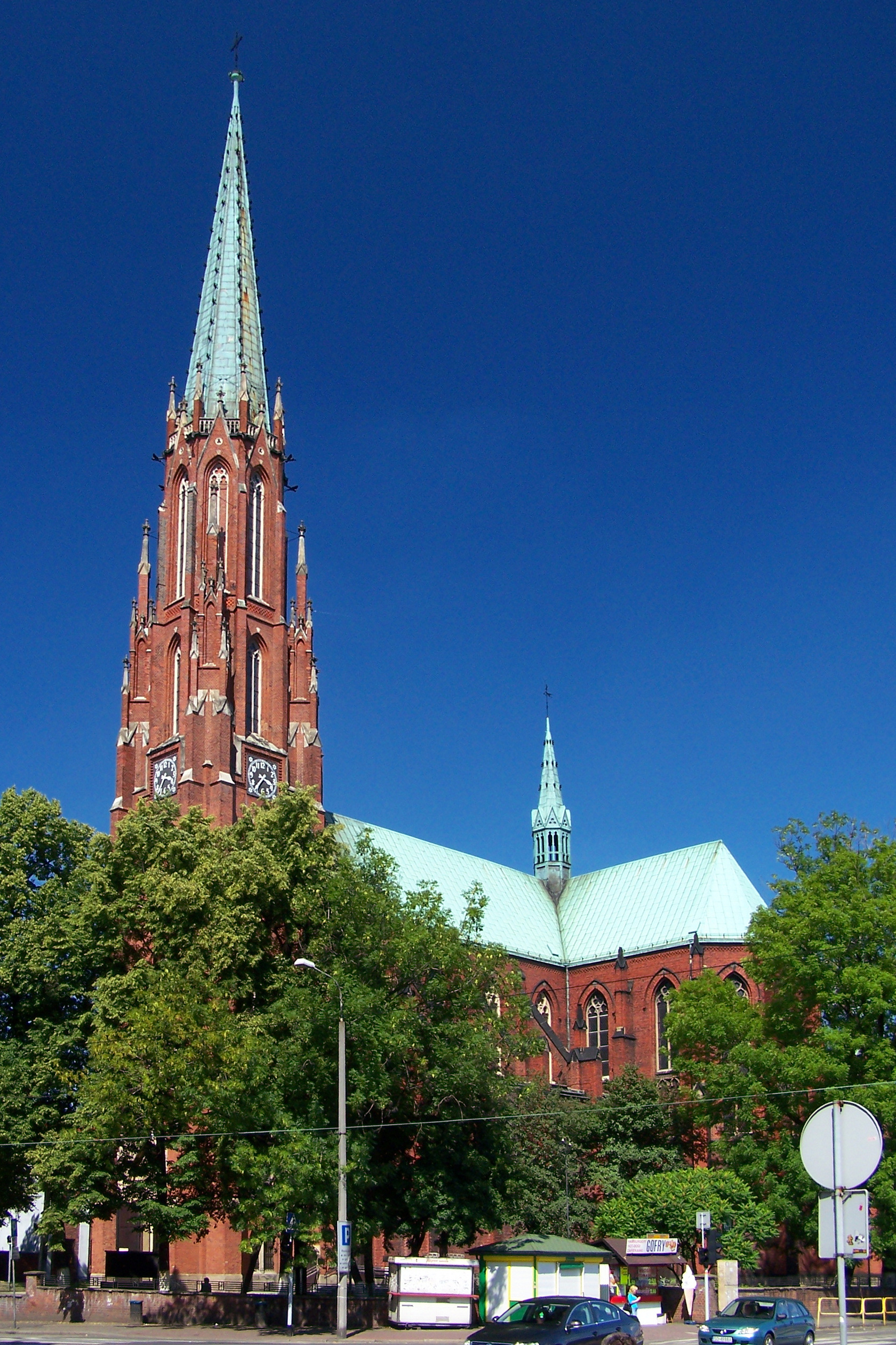
Holy Trinity Church

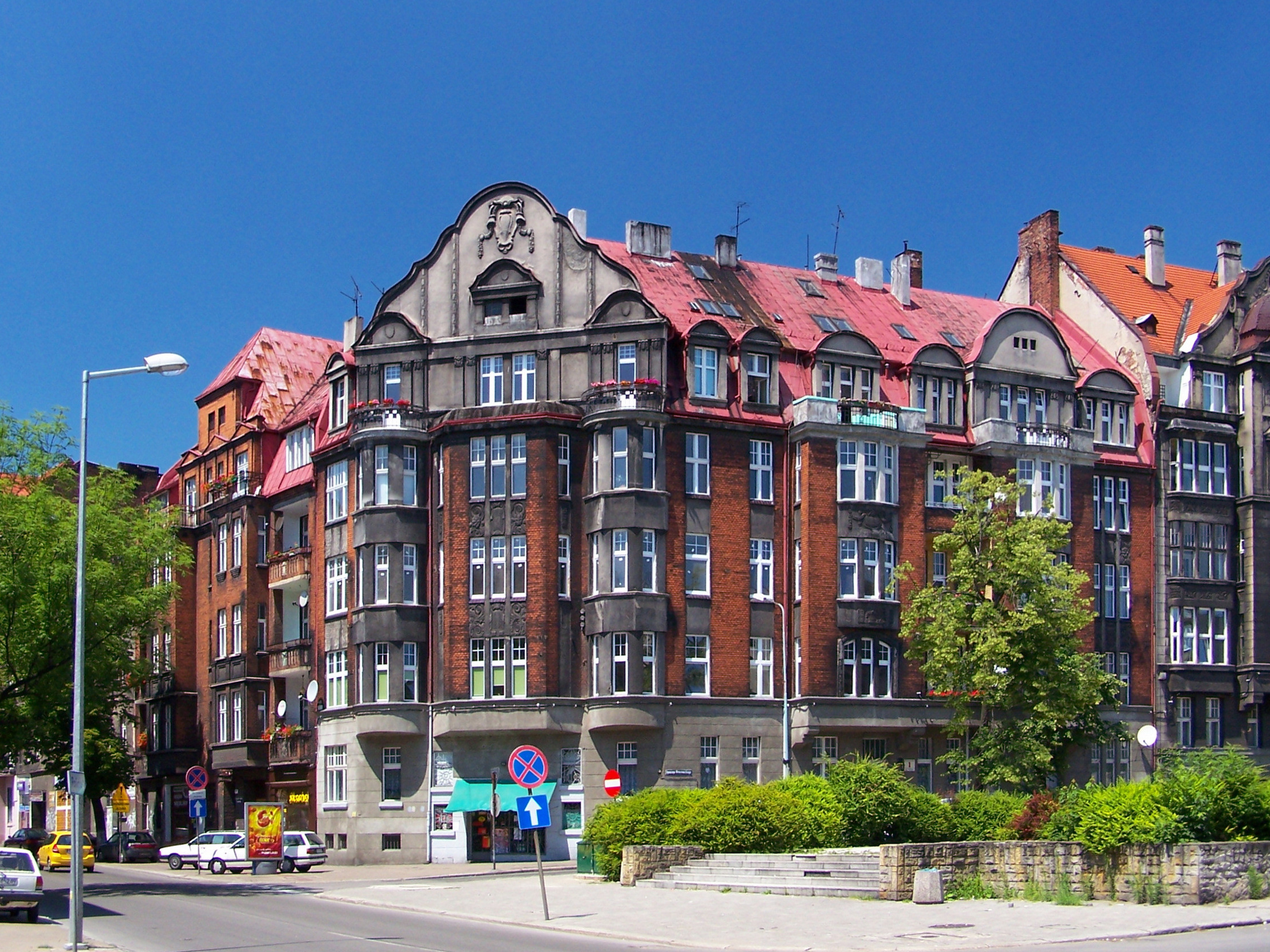
Kraszewski Street

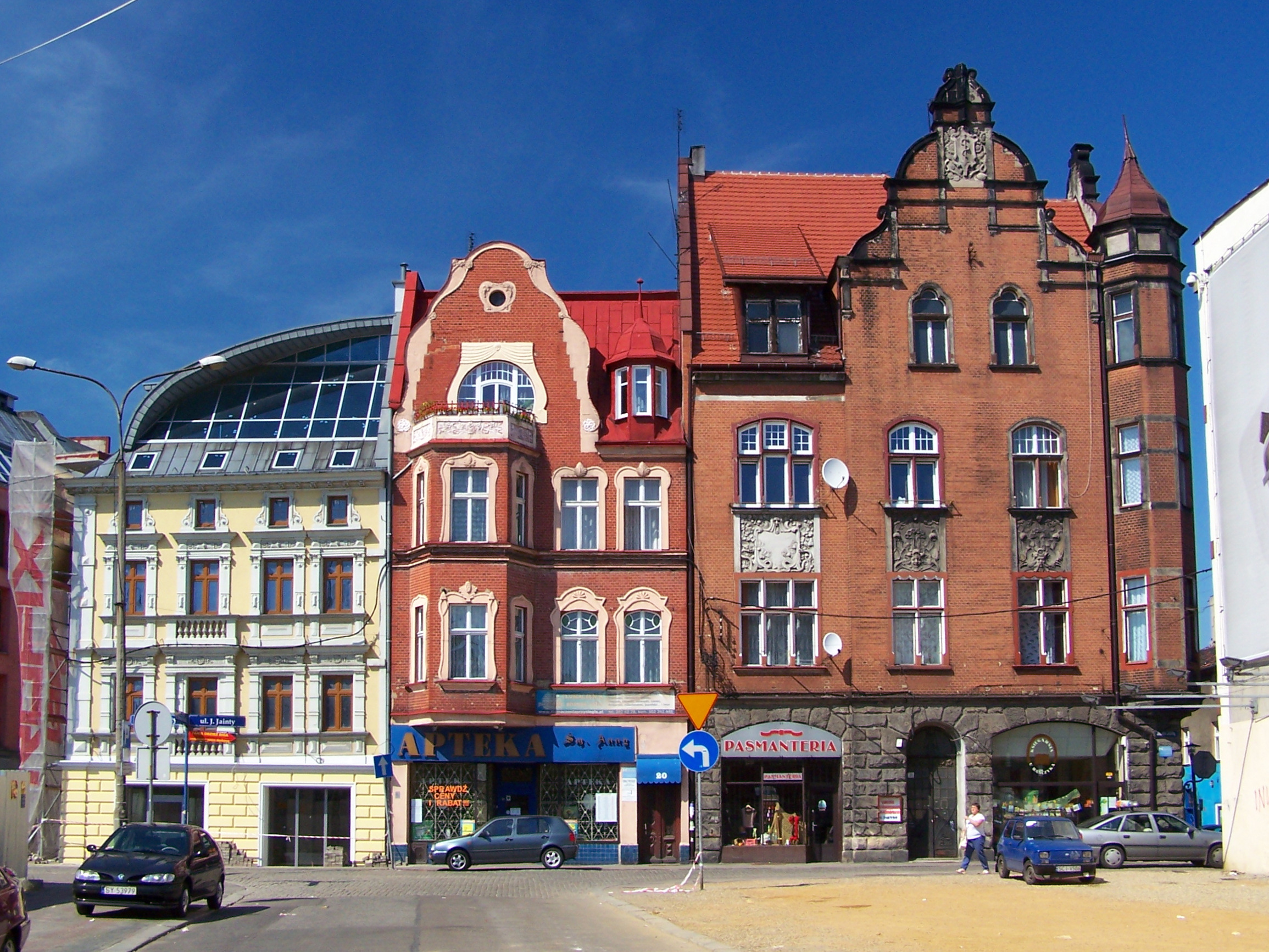
Townhouses on Jainty Street

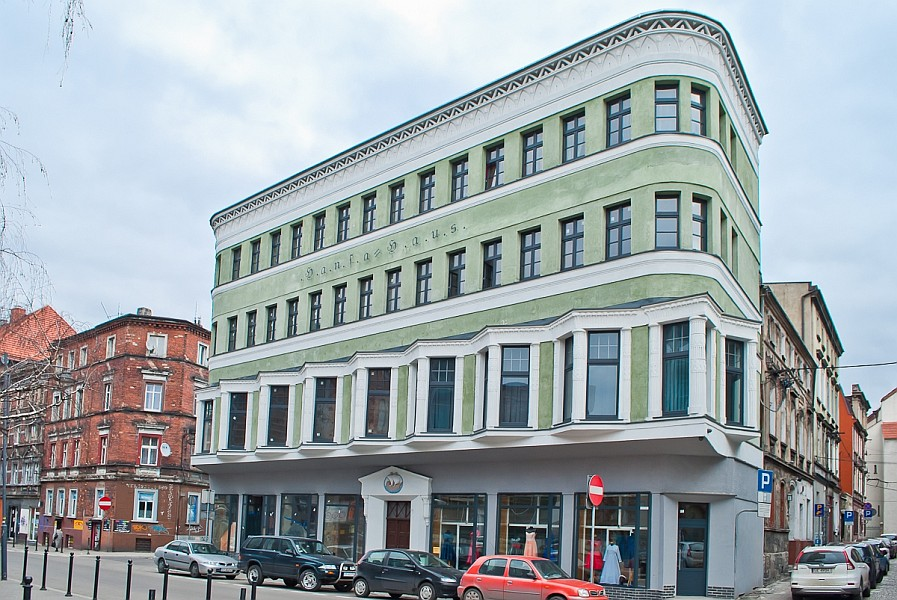
Tenement house on Weber's Street
