= Reinhard Opitz =

Reinhard Opitz (2 July 1934, Beuthen, Province of Upper Silesia – 3 April 1986) was a German left-wing intellectual and social scientist whose best-known thesis postulates that members of the German middle class had acquired a "falsified" consciousness.

A prolific writer and theorist, Opitz, who had a Ph.D. in philosophy, spent the greater part of his working life on the fringes of political movements. While the majority of his writings forcefully argue the correctness of finer points in the works of Karl Marx, his most widely remembered personal contribution to Marxist theory was the "falsified" consciousness position. The completed essay, entitled On Genesis and Prevention of Fascism, appeared in the autumn 1974 issue of the leftist German academic publication Das Argument.

Reinhard Opitz died of cancer in Cologne, where he had lived for twenty years. He was 51 years old.

In 1999, thirteen years after his death, Rainer Rilling and Ilina Fach published Liberalism—Fascism—Integration (ISBN 3-924684-88-X), a three-volume edition (in German, 1490 pages) of the most relevant pieces Opitz had written and published.
