= Józef Kachel =

Polish politician

Józef Kachel (6 September 1913 – 11 November 1983) was a Polish Boy Scouts Scoutmaster in Germany, a member of the Polish United Workers' Party (PZPR), and a Member of the Polish Parliament

== Biography ==
Born in Beuthen in Upper Silesia, Kachel came from a mining family, and was raised in the Polish tradition. He was a member of the Union of Poles in Germany. In 1924 he joined the Polish Scouting Association (Związek Harcerstwa Polskiego or ZHP) in Germany. From March 1935 to September 1939 Kachel was the head of the Polish Scouting Association in Germany, and organized training courses for Scout instructors at Warmia and Powiśle. After the Invasion of Poland of 1939 the ZHP were branded criminals by Nazi Germany, who had executed many Scouts and Guides, along with other possible resistance leaders, but the ZHP carried on as a clandestine organization. In 1940, the Soviet Union executed most of the Boy Scouts held at Ostashkov prison. Kachel was imprisoned in Buchenwald concentration camp.

After the war he obtained an engineering degree in mining at the University of Mining and Metallurgy in Kraków and worked in Bytom. From 1957 to 1961 he was a Member of the Polish Parliament. He took part in the Society for the Development of the Western Lands and the main Commission for Investigation of German Crimes in Poland.

Kachel's book Letters from Buchenwald was published in 1988 by the Silesian Institute in Opole.

== Sources ==
- Tadeusz Oracki,Biographical Dictionary of Warmia, Mazury and Powiśle century (until 1945), PAX Publishing Institute, Warsaw, 1983
