= Marcin Suchański =

Polish footballer

Personal information
- Full name: Marcin Suchański
- Date of birth: 23 June 1977 (age 49)
- Place of birth: Bytom, Poland
- Height: 1.85 m (6 ft 1 in)
- Position: Goalkeeper

Senior career*
Years	Team	Apps	(Gls)
1993	Ruch Radzionków		
1994–1996	Górnik Zabrze	0	(0)
1996–2003	Ruch Radzionków	4	(0)
2003–2008	Polonia Bytom	53	(0)
2008–2010	GKS Tychy	39	(0)
2010	Orzeł Babienica/Psary	14	(0)
2011–2012	Ruch Radzionków	16	(0)
2012–2013	Zagłębie Sosnowiec	17	(0)
2013	MLKS Woźniki		
2015–2017	Unia Świerklaniec		
2017–2018	Polonia Bytom	18	(0)
2018	Orzeł Miedary	1	(0)
2019–2020	Rozbark Bytom	13	(0)
2021–2022	AKS Mikołów	0	(0)
2023	LKS Żyglin	0	(0)
- * Club domestic league appearances and goals

Marcin Suchański (born 23 June 1977) is a Polish former professional footballer who played as a goalkeeper.

== Career ==
In February 2011, he joined Ruch Radzionków on a one-year contract.

== Honours ==
Polonia Bytom

- IV liga Silesia II: 2017–18
