= Marek Suker =

Polish footballer

Personal information
- Full name: Marek Suker
- Date of birth: 31 October 1982 (age 43)
- Place of birth: Bytom, Poland
- Height: 1.93 m (6 ft 4 in)
- Position: Striker

Team information
- Current team: Silesia Miechowice (player-manager)
- Number: 2

Youth career
- Silesia Miechowice
- Bobrek Karb Bytom

Senior career*
Years	Team	Apps	(Gls)
2000–2001	Gwarek Zabrze		
2001–2004	Ruch Chorzów	43	(1)
2004–2005	Walka Makoszowy		
2005–2010	Ruch Radzionków	145	(69)
2011–2011	Zagłębie Sosnowiec	2	(1)
2012–2013	Orzeł Miedary		
2013–	Silesia Miechowice		

Managerial career
- 2019–: Silesia Miechowice (player-manager)
- * Club domestic league appearances and goals as of 1 November 2024

Marek Suker (born 31 October 1982) is a Polish footballer who plays as a striker for Silesia Miechowice, where he serves as a player-manager.

== Career ==
In December 2010, he joined Zagłębie Sosnowiec on a one-and-a-half-year contract.

== Honours ==
Ruch Radzionków

- II liga West: 2009–10
- III liga Opole–Silesia: 2008–09
