= Coat of arms of Bytom =

Versions
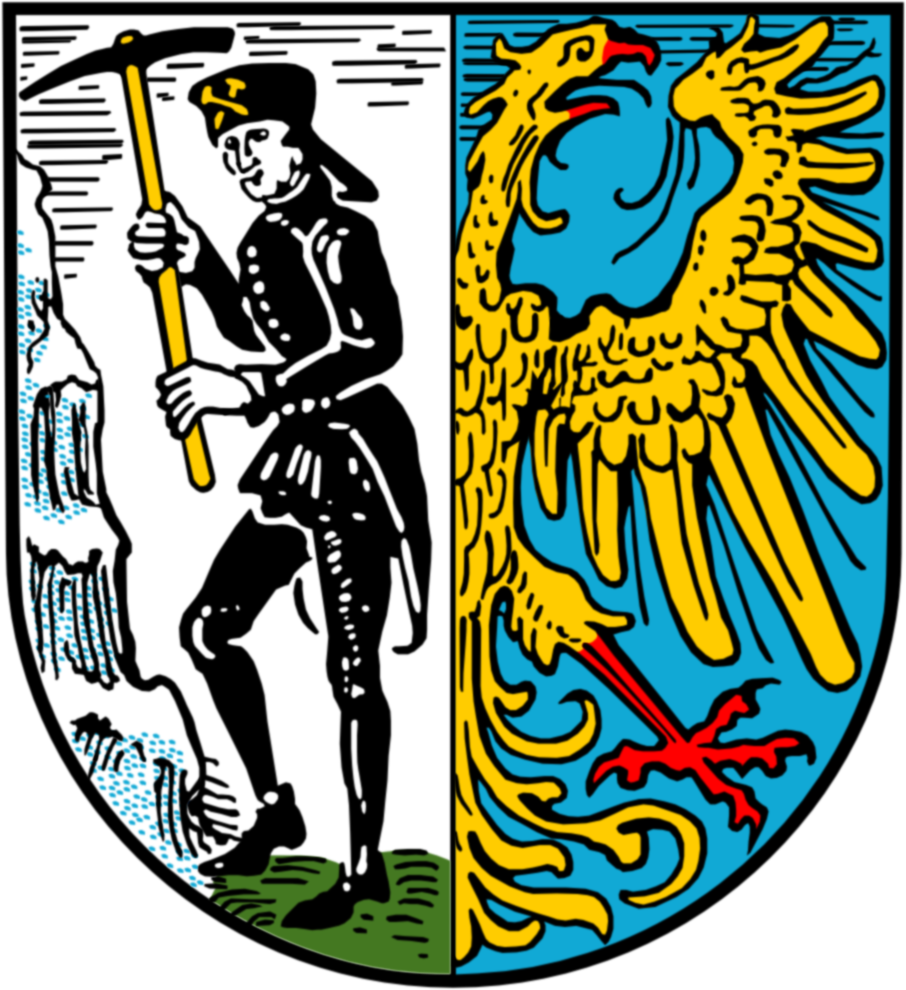
- 1898 version by Otto Hupp
- Armiger: Gmina Bytom
- Adopted: 1886

The coat of arms of Bytom in Silesia, Poland, was adopted in 1886 by a resolution of the town council.

The arms are composed of two symbols. The left (heraldic: dexter) half shows a miner digging with a pickaxe for smithsonite, referring to the town's centuries-long tradition as a mining area. The right (heraldic: sinister) half features a golden demi-eagle on a blue field, (half of) the device of the Upper Silesian dukes of the Piast dynasty. This combination of a miner and the ducal eagle dates from the 14th century.
