= Silesian Opera =

Opera company in Bytom, Poland

Coordinates: 50.3439°N 18.9210°E

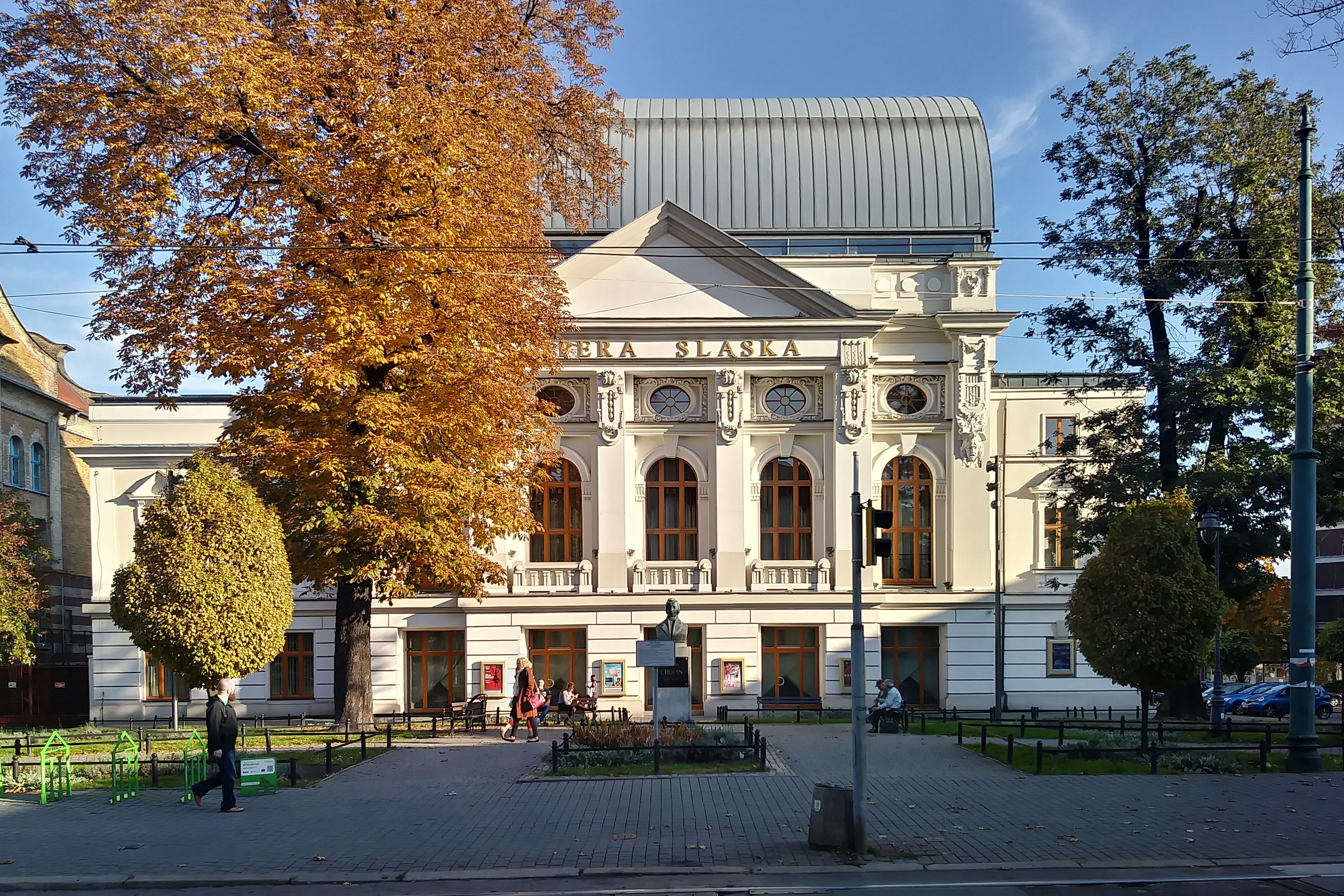
Silesian Opera facade (2019)

Silesian Opera in Bytom (Polish: Opera Śląska w Bytomiu) is an opera company in Bytom, Silesia, Poland, that was founded in 1945. Its home is the former City Theatre, designed by architect Albert Bohm, that was built in Neoclassical style between 1898 and 1901.

Adamo Didur was the first artistic director.
