= Sleeping Lion, Bytom =

Sleeping Lion
- Lew Śpiący
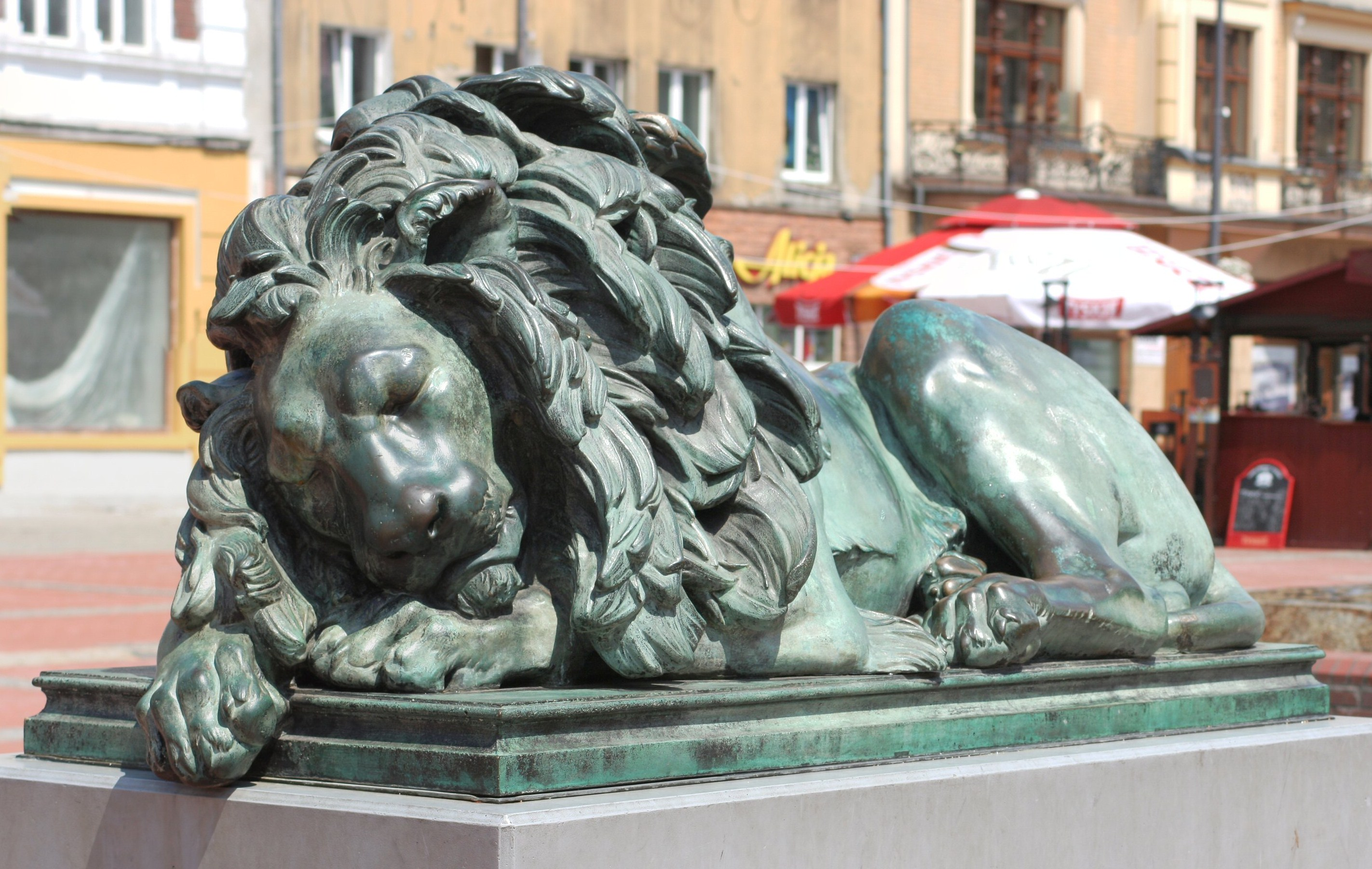
- The Sleeping Lion in Bytom, 2009
- Interactive map of Sleeping Lion
- Location: Market Square, Bytom, Poland
- Coordinates: 50°20′49″N 18°55′26″E
- Designer: Theodor Erdmann Kalide
- Type: cast
- Material: bronze
- Completion date: April–June 1873
- Opening date: 1873; 2008

The Sleeping Lion (Polish: Lew śpiący, German: Schlafender Löwe) is a monument located in the market square, Bytom, Poland. The monument has become one of Bytom's most notable landmarks.

== History ==
The monument was initially raised in 1873, to commemorate fallen inhabitants of the Beuthen District in the Franco-Prussian War. The Sleeping Lion originally stood on top of a plinth, on which the names of the fallen were written.

In 1932 the monument was moved to the Academic Square (Polish: Plac Akademicki).

In 1945, during the Second World War the monument's plinth was destroyed. Afterwards the lion was moved to the city park.

It is not known when, but the Sleeping Lion made its way to Warsaw where it laid at the gates of the Warsaw Zoo. In 2008 the monument returned to Bytom.

== Sources ==
- "„Lew śpiący” – historia jednego odlewu". instytutkorfantego.pl. Retrieved October 7, 2020.
- "Powrót lwa!". bytom.pl. Retrieved October 7, 2020.
- "Tajemnicza historia śpiącego lwa". bytom.pl. Retrieved October 7, 2020.
- "Wstydliwa historia, czyli rzecz o bytomskim lwie". histmag.org. Retrieved October 7, 2020.
