= Market Square, Bytom =

Public square in Bytom, Poland

Market Square Rynek
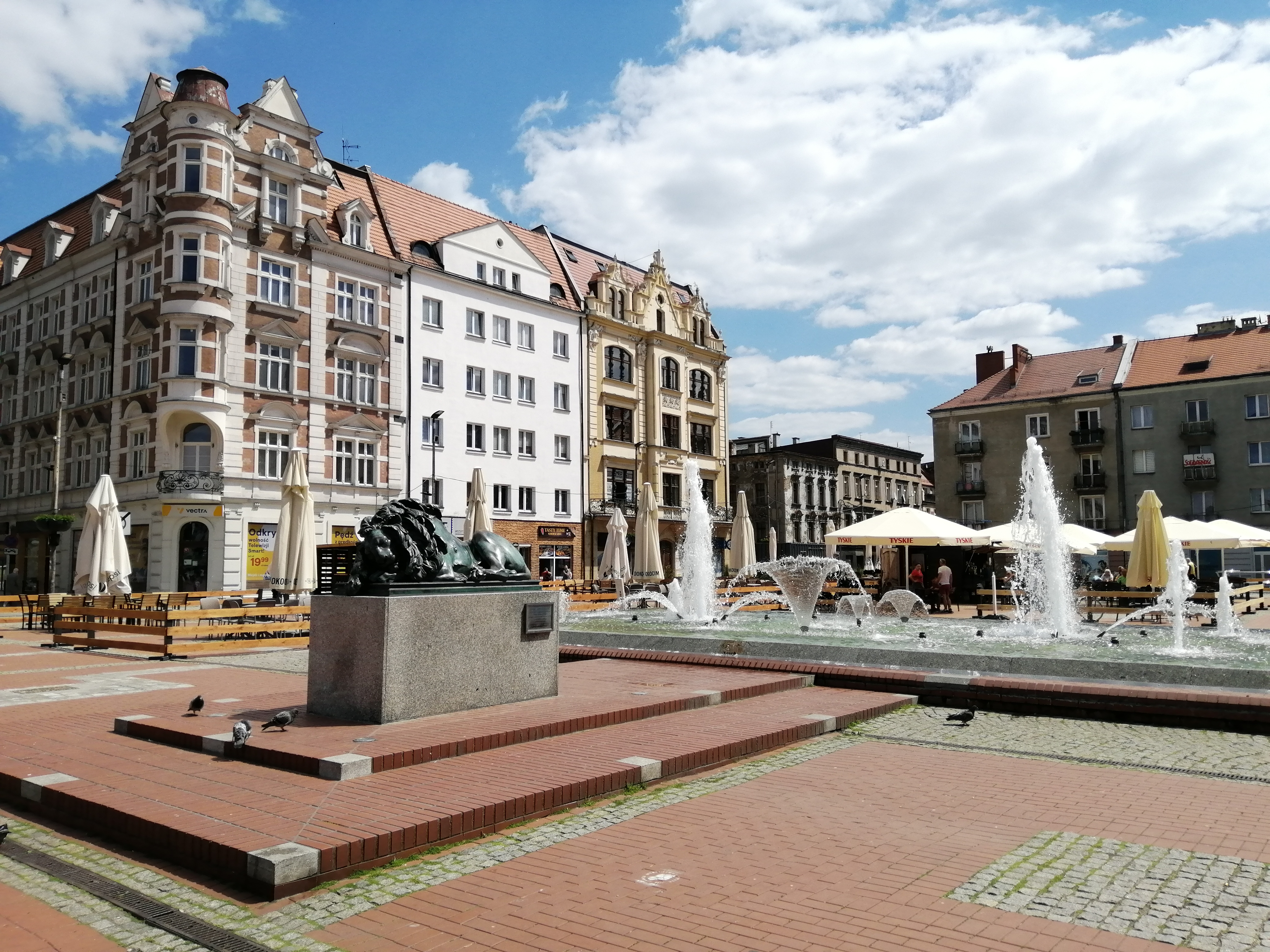
- View of the Market Square in 2021
- Interactive map of Market Square; Rynek
- Former names: Ring, Marktplatz plac Inwalidów Wojennych plac Poli Maciejowskiej
- Location: Bytom, Poland
- Coordinates: 50°20′49″N 18°55′24″E

Market Square (Polish: Rynek) is a central feature of the Śródmieście district in the city of Bytom, Poland. This market square, the main one in the city, dates to the Middle Ages. It has been rebuilt several times.

Notable landmarks on the market square include the Bytom City Hall, and the Sleeping Lion statue (Lew śpiący, Sterbender Löwe).

During a 2009 vote the market square was voted as one of the "Seven Architectural Wonders of the Silesian Voivodeship."
