= Bytom Castle =

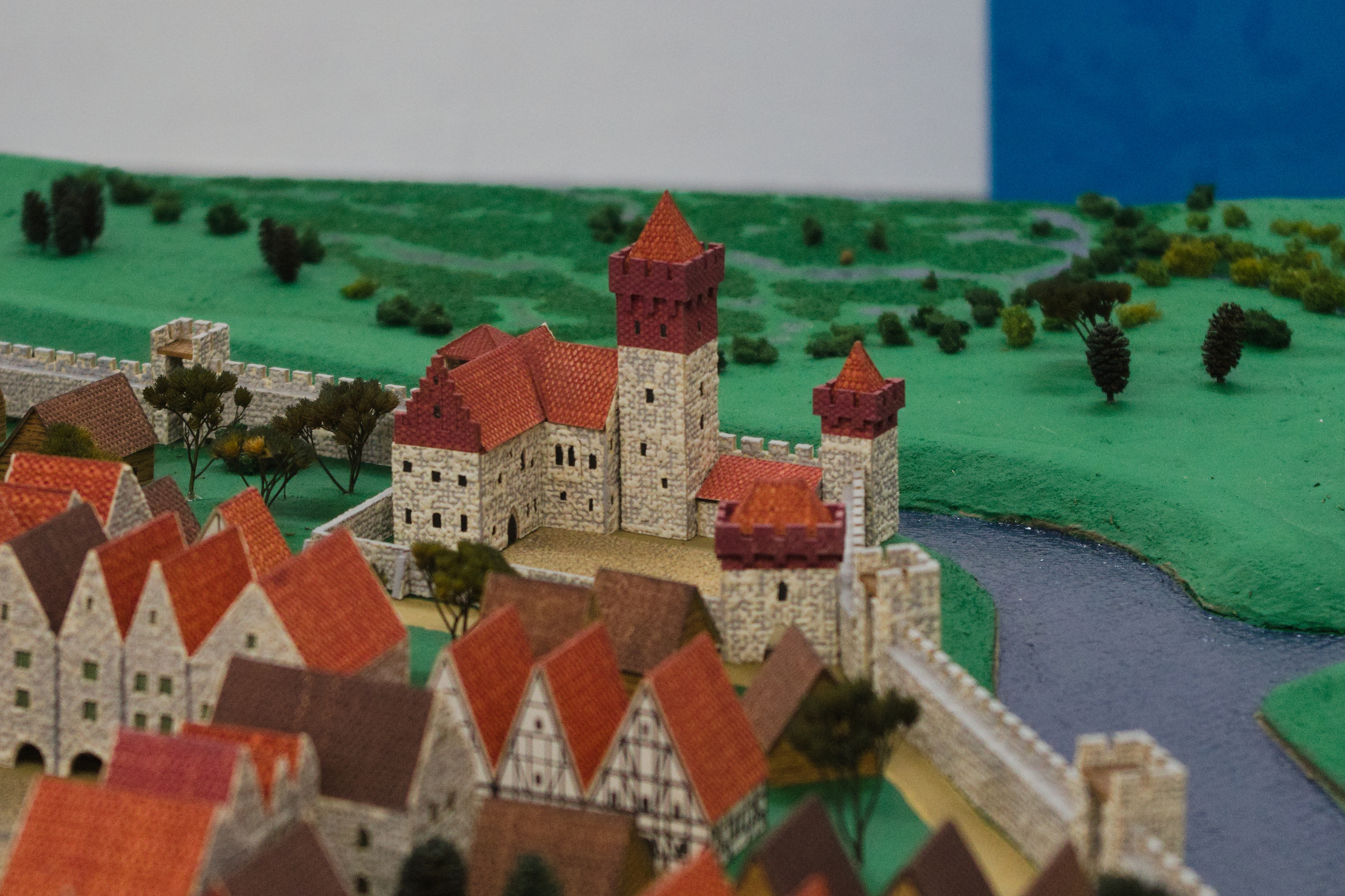
- Model of the Bytom Castle

- Location of the Bytom Castle in Poland
- 50.3476°N 18.9252°E
- Location: Bytom, Silesian Voivodeship; in Poland

History
- Built: 1284-1299
- Demolished: 15th-17th centuries

Site notes
- Architectural style: Romanesque

Bytom Castle (Polish: Zamek Książąt Śląskich w Bytomiu) is a castle in Bytom, Silesian Voivodeship, Poland.

The castle was probably built between 1284 and 1299. The princely residence was built on a rectangular plan and was a multi-storey building. The castle in its main part was built of stone, but some buildings were made of wood. Behind the stone gate was a fortified courtyard with a well. For a period in medieval times until the mid-14th century it was the seat of the Dukes of Bytom. In the following centuries the castle was completely demolished and the building blocks derived from it were used in the construction of another.
