= Polish Water Polo Championships =

National championship

Polish Water polo Championships (Polish: Mistrzostwa Polski w piłce wodnej mężczyzn) is an annual water polo competition organised by the Polish Swimming Federation (PZP), which serves as the Polish national championship for the sport.

First water polo championships in Poland were organized in 1925. Despite being really rare even a few years ago, this sport is at the moment getting more and more popular all around Poland. The inaugural champions were Jutrzenka Kraków. Currently, the title is held by AZS Uniwersytet Warszawski.

== Water polo champions of Poland ==
- 1925 – Jutrzenka Kraków
- 1926 – Jutrzenka Kraków
- 1927 – Jutrzenka Kraków
- 1928 – Makkabi Kraków
- 1929 – Makkabi Kraków
- 1930 – Makkabi Kraków
- 1931 – Makkabi Kraków
- 1932 – Makkabi Kraków
- 1933 – EKS Katowice
- 1934 – EKS Katowice
- 1935 – EKS Katowice
- 1936 – EKS Katowice
- 1937 – EKS Katowice
- 1938 – TP Katowice–Giszowiec
- 1939–1945 – no championships
- 1946 – KSZO Ostrowiec
- 1947 – Polonia Bytom
- 1948 – KSZO Ostrowiec
- 1949 – Elektryczność Warsaw
- 1950 – Polonia Bytom
- 1951 – no championships
- 1952 – Cracovia
- 1953 – Legia Warsaw
- 1954 – Legia Warsaw
- 1955 – Legia Warsaw
- 1956 – Legia Warsaw
- 1957 – Legia Warsaw
- 1958 – Legia Warsaw
- 1958 – Legia Warsaw
- 1959 – Polonia Bytom
- 1960 – Legia Warsaw
- 1961 – Legia Warsaw
- 1962 – Legia Warsaw
- 1963 – Legia Warsaw
- 1964 – Polonia Bytom
- 1965 – Legia Warsaw
- 1966 – Arkonia Szczecin
- 1967 – Arkonia Szczecin
- 1968 – Arkonia Szczecin
- 1969 – Arkonia Szczecin
- 1970 – Arkonia Szczecin
- 1971 – Arkonia Szczecin
- 1972 – KSZO Ostrowiec
- 1973 – KSZO Ostrowiec
- 1974 – Arkonia Szczecin
- 1975 – Arkonia Szczecin
- 1976 – Arkonia Szczecin
- 1977 – Stilon Gorzów Wielkopolski
- 1978 – Stilon Gorzów Wielkopolski
- 1979 – Arkonia Szczecin
- 1980 – Stilon Gorzów Wielkopolski
- 1981 – Stilon Gorzów Wielkopolski
- 1982 – Stilon Gorzów Wielkopolski
- 1983 – Stilon Gorzów Wielkopolski
- 1984 – Stilon Gorzów Wielkopolski
- 1985 – Stilon Gorzów Wielkopolski
- 1986 – Stilon Gorzów Wielkopolski
- 1987 – Stilon Gorzów Wielkopolski
- 1988 – Stilon Gorzów Wielkopolski
- 1989 – Stilon Gorzów Wielkopolski
- 1990 – Stilon Gorzów Wielkopolski
- 1991 – Stilon Gorzów Wielkopolski
- 1992 – Anilana Łódź
- 1993 – Anilana Łódź
- 1994 – KSZO Ostrowiec
- 1995 – KSZO Ostrowiec
- 1996 – Stilon Goróow Wielkopolski
- 1997 – KSZO Ostrowiec
- 1998 – KSZO Ostrowiec
- 1999 – Anilana Łódź
- 2000 – Anilana Łódź
- 2001 – KSZO Ostrowiec
- 2002 – ŁSTW Łódź
- 2003 – ŁSTW Łódź
- 2004 – ŁSTW Łódź
- 2005 – ŁSTW Łódź
- 2006 – ŁSTW Łódź
- 2007 – ŁSTW Łódź
- 2008 – Arkonia Szczecin
- 2009 – ŁSTW Łódź
- 2010 – ŁSTW Łódź
- 2011 – ŁSTW Łódź
- 2012 – Arkonia Szczecin
- 2013 – ŁSTW Łódź
- 2014 – ŁSTW Łódź
- 2015 – ŁSTW Łódź
- 2016 – Arkonia Szczecin
- 2017 – ŁSTW Łódź
- 2018 – ŁSTW Łódź
- 2019 – ŁSTW Łódź
- 2020 – Polonia Bytom
- 2021 – AZS Uniwersytet Warszawski
- 2022 – ŁSTW Łódź
- 2023 – AZS Uniwersytet Warszawski
- 2024 – AZS Uniwersytet Warszawski
- 2025 – AZS Uniwersytet Warszawski
- 2026 – AZS Uniwersytet Warszawski

== Sources ==
- pilkawodna.waw.pl
