= Chapel of the Blessed Virgin Mary and St. Joseph =

Church in Silesian Voivodeship, Poland

- Polish: Kaplica Najświętszej Marii Panny i Świętego Józefa
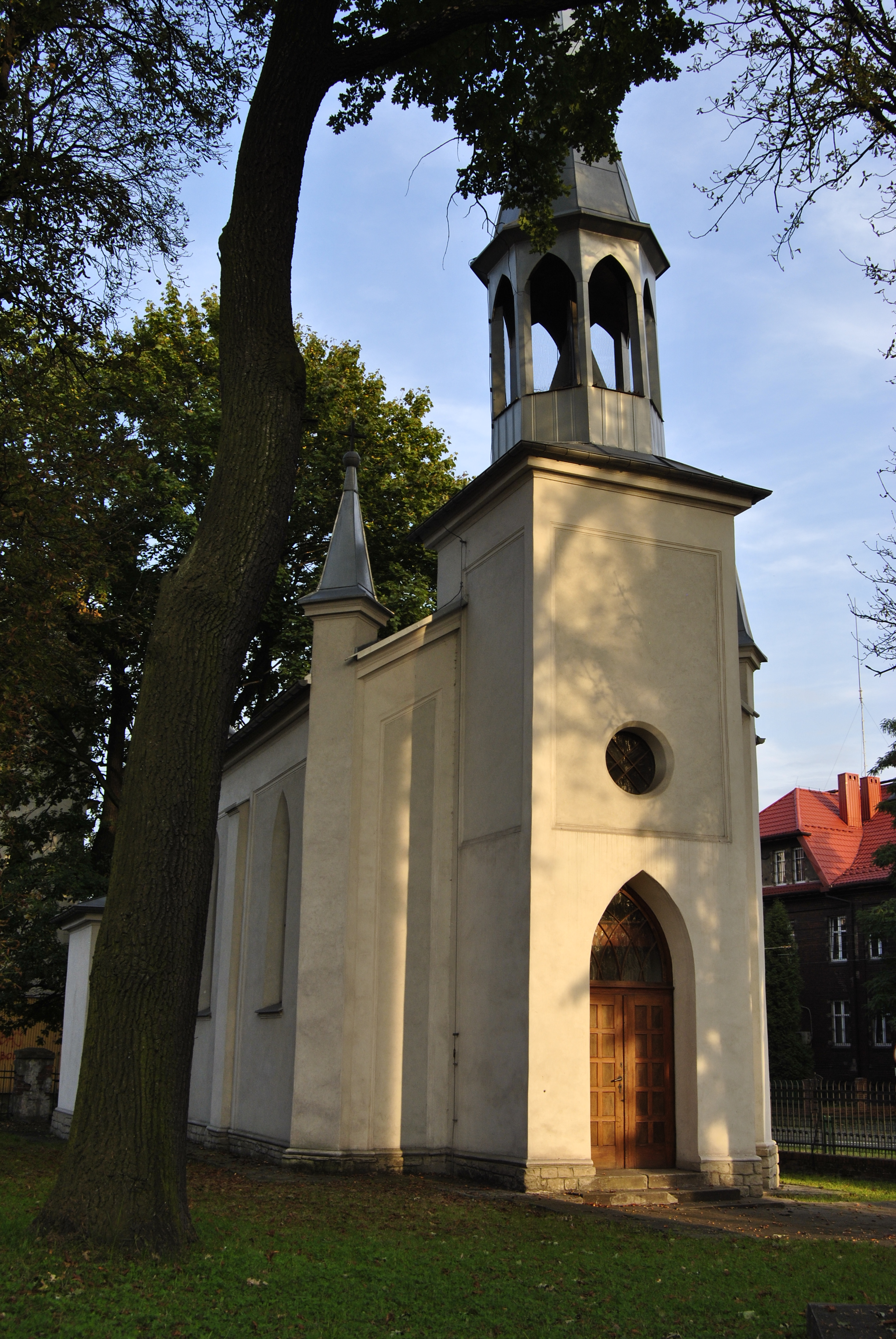
- The chapel in 2014.
- Chapel of the Blessed Virgin Mary and St. Joseph
- 50°20′17″N 18°53′20″E
- Location: Bytom (Szombierki)
- Address: ul. Zabrzańska
- Country: Poland
- Denomination: Catholic

History
- Founder(s): villagers Szymon Flatzek and August Cygan
- Consecrated: 25 October 1863 (162 years ago)

Architecture
- Architect: Johann Kowollik
- Style: Neo-Gothic
- Years built: 1859–1862

Specifications
- Capacity: 100

The Chapel of the Blessed Virgin Mary and St. Joseph (Polish: Kaplica Najświętszej Marii Panny i Świętego Józefa) is a chapel constructed between 1859–1862 in Bytom—Szombierki, Poland. The chapel was built in gratitude for God sparing the village during a cholera epidemic. Until 1974, it housed the icon of Our Lady of Bytom; from then on, a replica.

The chapel is listed on the Registry of Cultural Property of the Silesian Voivodeship under entry A/1483/24 from 25 November 2024.

== History ==
=== Construction ===
In June and October 1854, a cholera outbreak spread across Bytom district, devastating numerous localities. Szombierki, then a small village situated just south of Bytom, was particularly hard-hit, with approximately one-third of its population succumbing to the disease. In the wake of these events, the village's long-held aspirations for a local church were reignited.

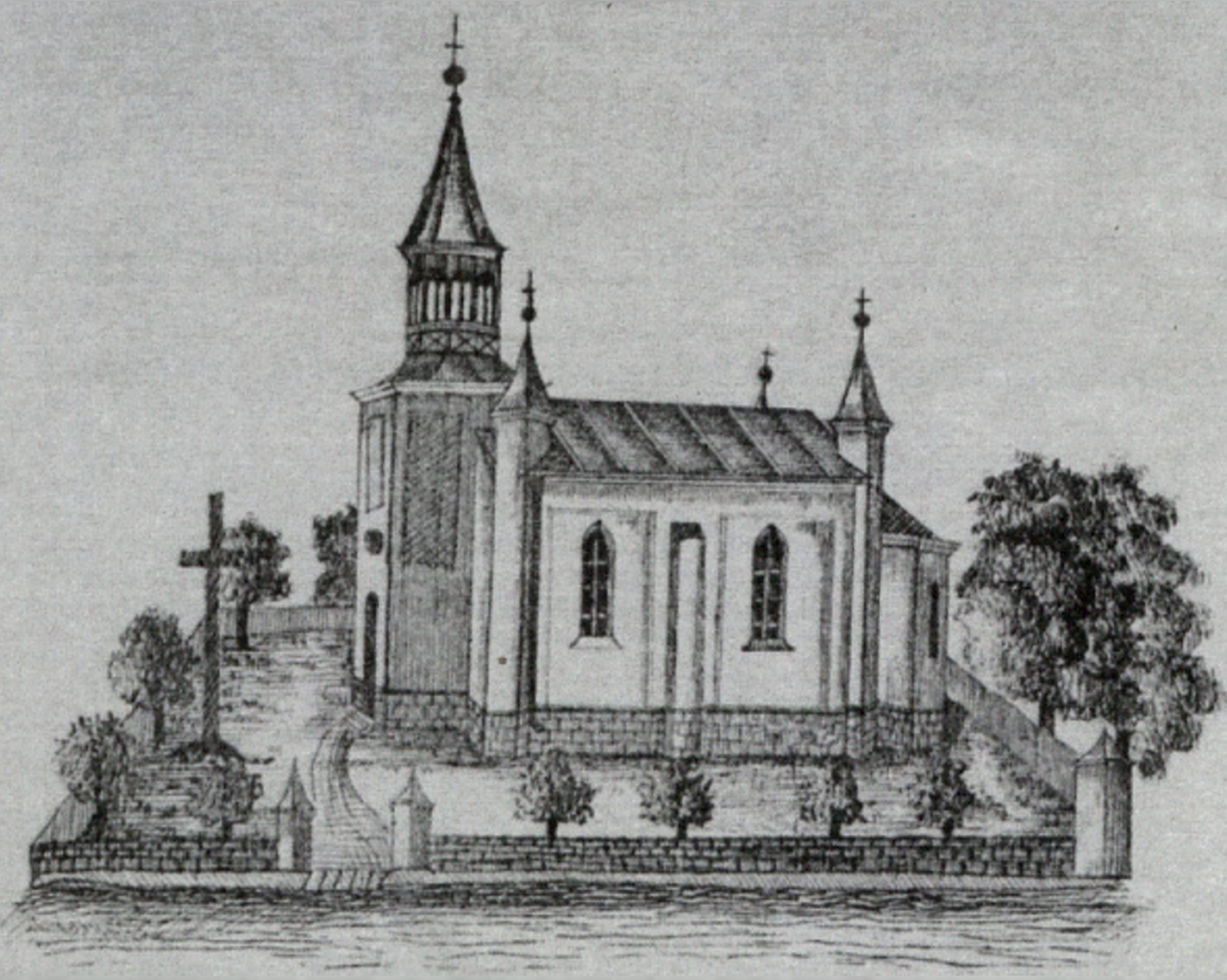
Illustration of the chapel in the printed work by parish priest Józef Szafranek on its completion and consecration, published in 1863 by the Bytom-based printing house B. Wylezol & Co.

The construction of the chapel was initiated by two local villagers—mayor Szymon Flatzek and Augustyn Cygan, as a sign of gratitude for God sparing the village. It was originally envisioned to be constructed on Flatzek's land. (Note: Located where master baker Bursig, who married into the Flatzek family, had his bakery until 1945; where in postwar years the cinema "Jutrzenka" operated.) However, this idea was rejected by Bytom parish priest Józef Szafranek, whose opposition came from the fact that in the direct vicinity of the proposed location (near the grounds of the later town hall) stood the inn of a local Jew, arguing that the surrounding environment would desecrate the chapel. Consequently, August Cygan donated part of his land, located beside the road leading to Bobrek, while mayor Szymon Flatzek, alongside his father Kazimierz, committed to covering the majority of the construction costs.

On 8 August 1859, an agreement was signed in which August Cygan, the owner of plot No. 16, ceded part of it for the construction of a church. The value of the ceded plot was estimated at 20 thalers. Once all the official formalities were completed, construction could begin. The design of the chapel was prepared by Johann Kowollik, a renowned master bricklayer from Bytom, and approved by Teodor Linke, the principal architect of the Schaffgotsch family. As early as September 1859, earthworks began; soon thereafter, on 25 October 1859, the cornerstone was laid.

"In the autumn of 1854, an epidemic of cholera ravaged our small village so severely that one-third of the residents perished. During this time, when the epidemic was so devastating, a local farmer, my grandfather Kazimierz Flatzek, along with my father Szymon, went from house to house collecting donations for the construction of the chapel. The donations were generous, but signs of the epidemic also appeared in my father Szymon, until one day, he too could no longer get out of bed. In this despair, my father, who was a devout follower of the Blessed Virgin Mary, made a vow that he would never drink a drop of alcohol in his life, and that, upon recovery, he would dedicate the chapel to the Holy Mary. The next morning the doctor arrived, my father got out of bed, [and] was healthy and cheerful. He upheld his vow that he would never drink a drop of alcohol until his death."

— Stanisław Flatzek, son of village mayor Szymon Flatzek

Construction work began in the spring of 1860 and was carried out by the construction company of Walenty Kuźnia from nearby Karb, with significant involvement from the residents of Szombierki. By mid-1862, the construction had reached its basic completion. On 3 or 13 August 1862, the cross atop the tower was placed—previously consecrated at St. Margaret's Church outside Bytom. The chapel was ceremonially consecrated on 25 October 1863 by priest Bernard Purkop of Piekary Śląskie; its consecration was attended by a large number of residents of Szombierki, as well as the neighbouring villages of Bobrek and Orzegów. Despite the chapel's completion, Szombierki remained under the Parish of St. Mary in Bytom. (Note: Szombierki remained without a local parish until 1904, i.e. until the construction of the Church of the Most Sacred Heart of Jesus.)

The chapel's furnishings were humble, limited to bare essentials. The monstrance, consecrated in the Breslau Cathedral, was purchased by priest Józef Szafranek at the end of November 1864. It was acquired from Hoeptner & Co., based in Breslau, and described in the invoice as follows: 'Gothic monstrance. Base electro-silver plated, halo and Melchizedek roof finely gilded, including leather case – 50 thalers.' The bell was gifted by the Dominium. The organ was acquired from the St. Hyacinth Chapel in Rozbark. Featuring two registers and hand-operated bellows, it remained in use until 1896. That same year, the organ-building company Liefert based in Schweidnitz offered to sell the parish a small organ, featuring 6 registers, which had been temporarily installed in the church in Orzegów. This was made available as the assembly of a larger organ had just been completed by the firm. The purchase cost totalled 700 marks and was raised through voluntary donations, with a larger sum contributed by Woiczyk, a carpenter from Bobrek. The most valuable of the items acquired by the chapel was the 15th-century painting of Our Lady of Bytom, which came from the collections of the Parish of St. Mary in Bytom. It was donated by parish priest Józef Szafranek in 1863.

=== Establishment of church services and subsequent history ===
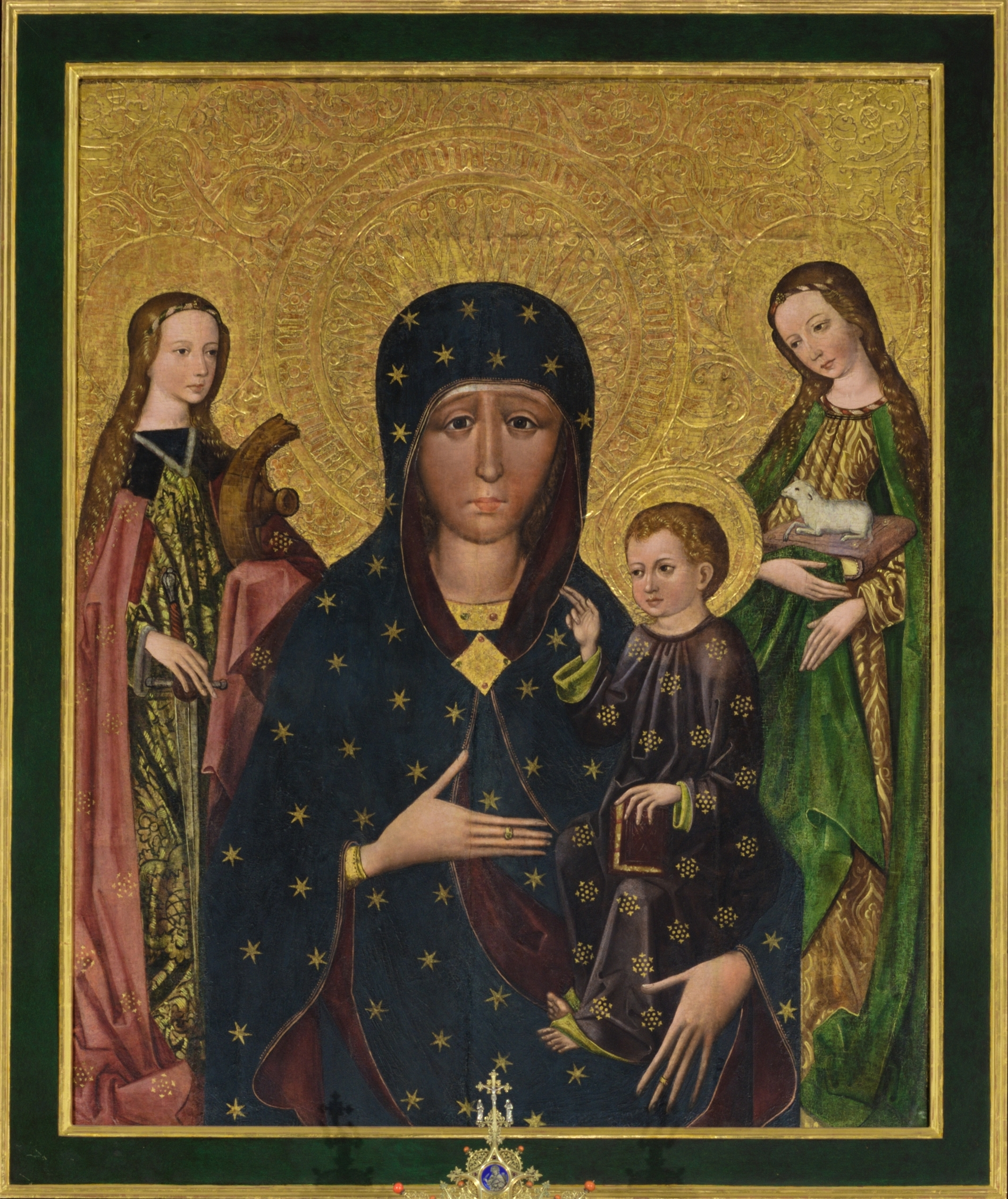
Icon of Our Lady of Bytom – its original was housed in the chapel until 1974. The image features prominently in the folk traditions of Szombierki.

Following the chapel's completion, priest Szafranek, supported by the village's Catholics, made efforts to establish regular church services at the chapel. Despite numerous petitions, the Prince-Bishop’s office in Breslau granted only two services per year. In spite of these shortcomings, the chapel offered some spiritual support to the local Catholic community. Each day at 5 a.m., noon, and 5 p.m., regardless of weather conditions, Szymon Flatzek (acting as its caretaker), rang the bell to call the faithful to prayer for the recitation of the Angelus. Although the chapel could accommodate up to 100 people, by the time of its construction, it was already insufficient to meet the religious needs of the community. While the population of Szombierki at the time of the chapel's consecration stood at 749, by 1875, it had already increased to 1,100 people. Consequently, during a municipal meeting on 18 September 1898, it was decided to initiate efforts towards raising a large parish church in Szombierki, capable of accommodating up to 3,000 people. These efforts would ultimately prove successful, leading to the construction of the Church of the Most Sacred Heart of Jesus and its subsequent consecration on 20 June 1905. (Note: The area surrounding the chapel was considered as a potential site for the new church; however, the junction of the former Beuthenerstraße and the road leading to Godula was ultimately chosen.)

Initially, the maintenance of the chapel was funded through voluntary donations from the villagers. Following the suspension of church services during the Kulturkampf, the village refused to provide further upkeep. Under clause 2 of the act of 20 June 1875, Szombierki did not constitute an independent parish, and the administration of the chapel came under the Catholic Council of the Bytom parish—thus, the chapel's oversight fell upon the latter. However, starting in the 1880s onward, Szombierki began including all maintenance expenses for the chapel in its municipal budget.

From 1960 til the turn of the 21st century, the chapel was renovated thrice, including in 1991. In the 1970s, through the efforts of priest Wacław Schenk, the original icon of Our Lady of Bytom returned to St. Mary's Church. The icon was removed from the chapel in July 1974; in its place a replica was installed. On 21 December 1970, under entry A/1151/70, the chapel was listed in the Polish Registry of Cultural Property (then within the Katowice Voivodeship); following administrative reforms, it was relisted under entry A/1483/24 on 25 November 2024 within the Silesian Voivodeship.

== Description ==
The chapel is freestanding, orientated, single-nave with a roof turret, built of brick and plastered. Constructed in a simplified Neo-Gothic style, the building features pointed, arched windows and a semi-circular apse. The gable roof is flanked by slender turrets on all four sides. Above the entrance, there is a round window with a tall roof turret rising above it. The chapel's interior forms a single open space with a small choir gallery housing an organ, a separated small sacristy, and is covered by a ribless cross vault. Inside there is a Neo-Gothic altar with a copy of the icon of Our Lady of Bytom, carved in wood and richly polychromed.

== See also ==
- Church of the Most Sacred Heart of Jesus in Szombierki

== Bibliography ==
- Grzeschik, Karl (January 1987). "Schombergs letzter Nachfahr seines stammes: Eine kleine Aufzeichnung zur Schomberger Geschichte — III. Teil". Gleiwitzer - Beuthener - Tarnowitzer Heimatblatt (in German). 37 (1). Hanau: Quellenverlag V. Diwisch: 362:34-364:36.
- Larisch, Józef (1989). Szombierki: zarys rozwoju dzielnicy (in Polish). Bytom.
- Larisch, Józef (1991). "Obiekty kultu religijnego w Szombierkach". In Drabina, Jan (ed.). Z dziejów dzielnic Bytomia (in Polish). Bytom: Towarzystwo Miłośników Bytomia. pp. 273–281.
- Łabęcka, Halina; Łabęcki, Zygmunt (1992). "Kościoły i kaplice Bytomia". Bytom wczoraj i dziś (in Polish). 1. Bytom: UM Bytom; P.D.K. „ANTIQUA”.
- Szczech, Bernard; Sobek, Adrian (2019). Ks. Józefa Szafranka: druki dotyczące budowy i poświęcenia kaplicy św. Józefa w Szombierkach (in Polish). Bytom: Wydawnictwo ED-FEL. ISBN 978-83-944618-7-4.
