= Szombierki Heat Power Station =

Coal-fired power station in Bytom, Poland

Szombierki Power Station
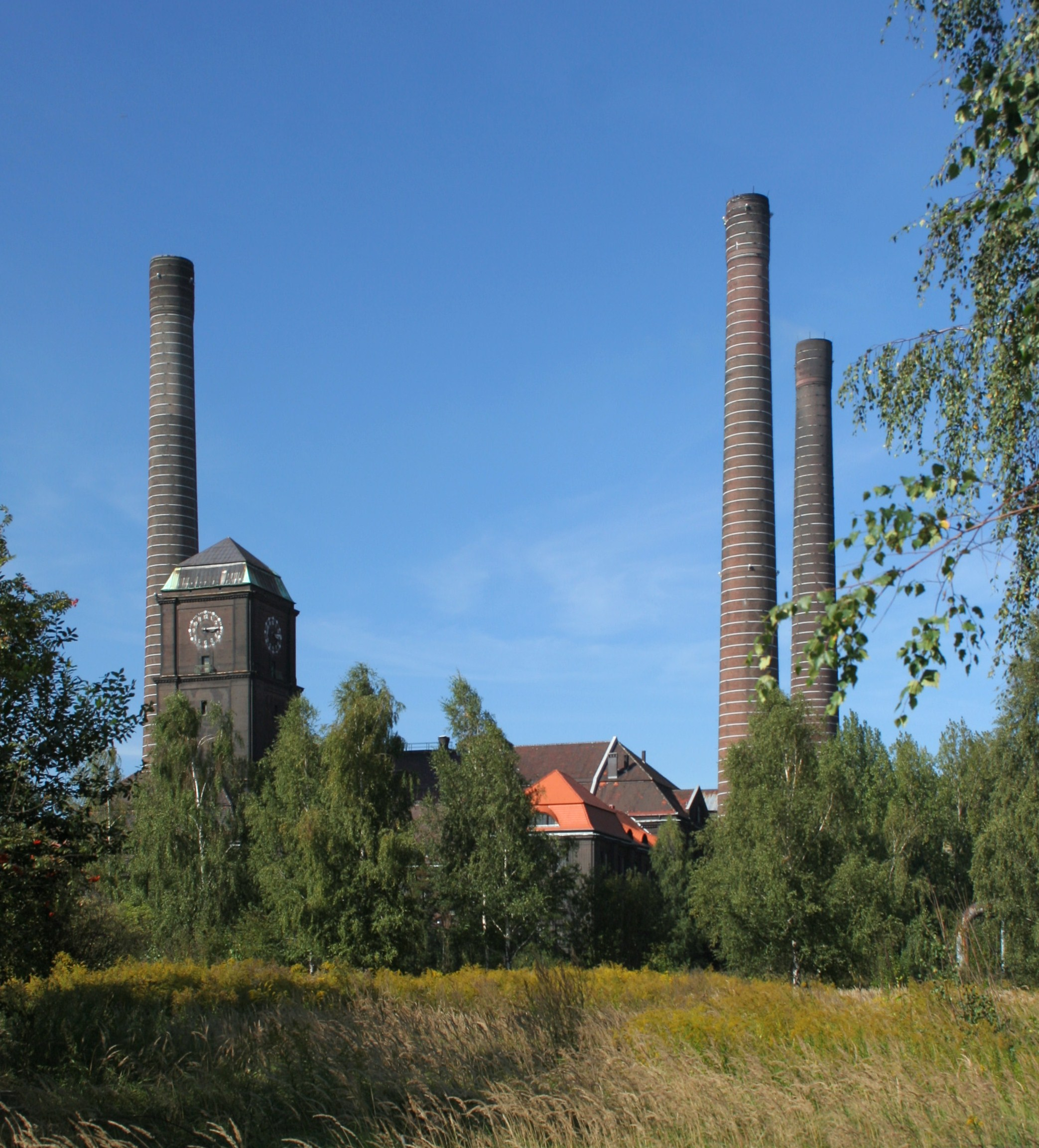
- Official name: Elektrociepłownia Szombierki
- Country: Poland
- Location: Bytom
- Coordinates: 50°20′42″N 18°53′11″E
- Status: Not operational since 2011
- Construction began: 1917
- Commission date: 1920
- Owner: Grupa ARCHE

Thermal power station
- Primary fuel: Coal
- Cogeneration?: Yes
- Thermal capacity: 8.8 MWt

Power generation
- Nameplate capacity: 29 MWe

External links
- Website: www.ecszombierki.pl
- Commons: Related media on Commons

Szombierki Power Station (Polish: Elektrociepłownia Szombierki) is a coal-fired power station in the Szombierki district of Bytom, Poland. Operational since 1920, since the 1990s it operates at a limited capacity, and is regarded as a monument due to its architectural values. Its first owner was Schaffgotsch Bergwerksgesellschaft GmbH. The overall height of the power station is 120 meters.

== History ==
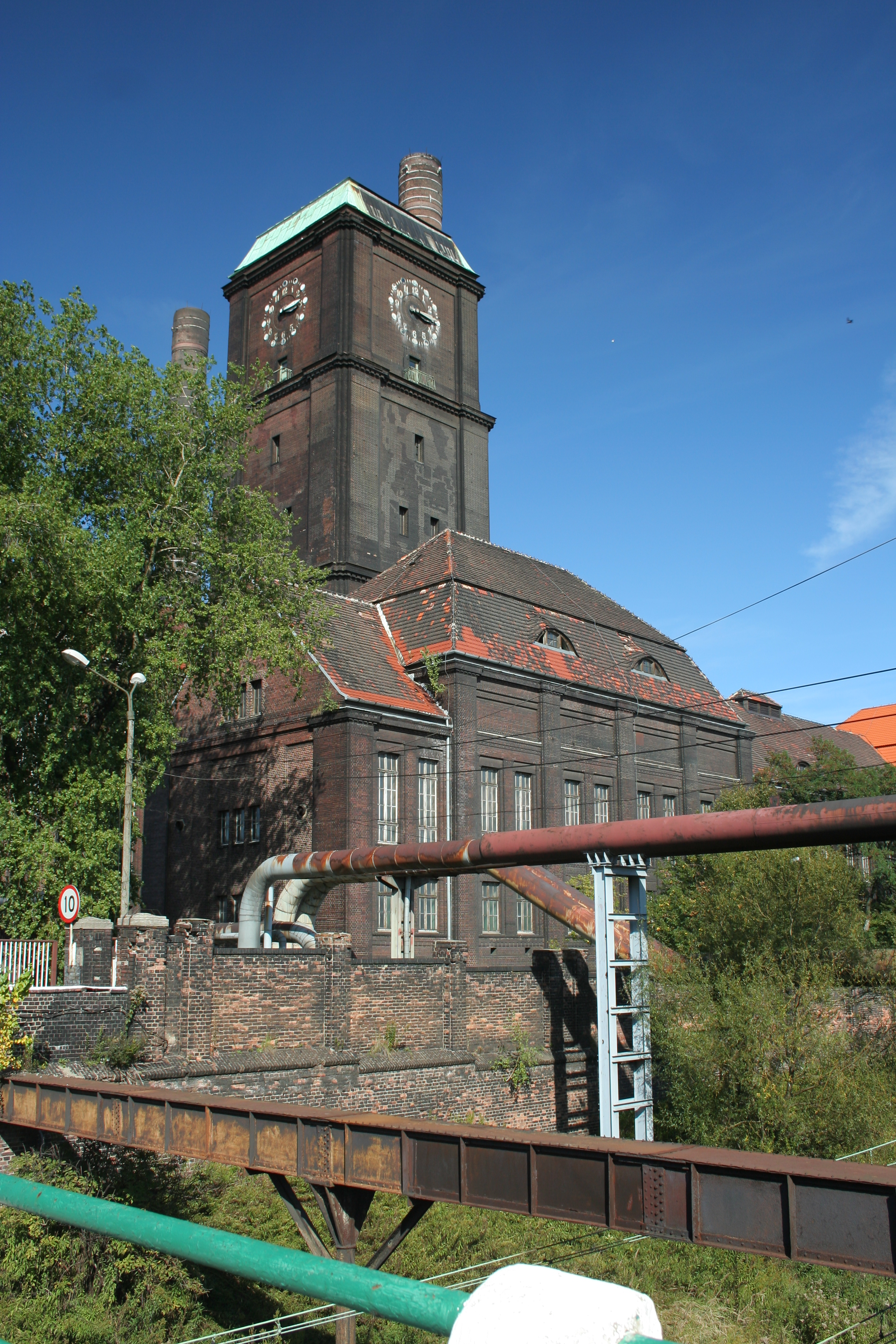
Historic clock tower at the Szombierki Power Plant

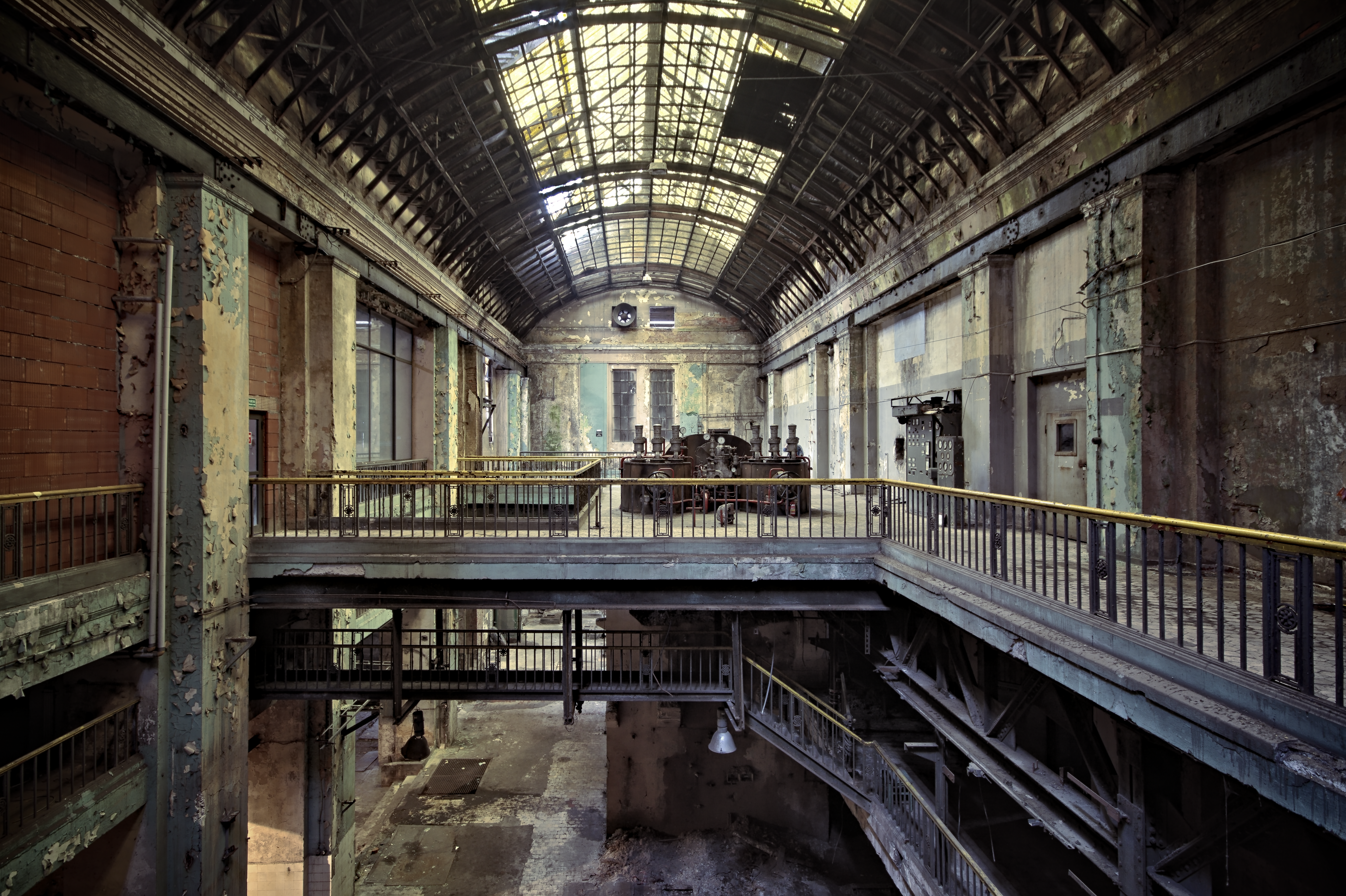
Interior

The power plant was completed after World War I, and started operations in 1920, providing electricity for the Bytom region (then part of Germany). The structure, originally intended to be an explosives factory, covers approximately 36,000 square metres (390,000 sq ft). It was originally operated by Schaffgotsch Bergwerksgesellschaft GmbH (a German company of the Schaffgotsch family). The structure was designed by German architects Georg and Emil Zillmann, known in Silesia as architects of the Nikiszowiec and Giszowiec districts in nearby Katowice. Notable features of the design included a large hall (2,800 square metres (30,000 sq ft)), three 120-metre (390 ft) chimneys, and a clock tower with a clock, one of the largest turret clocks in Poland.

By World War II the plant had a capacity of 100 MW. Quickly rebuilt after the war, and operating at a similar capacity in the 1950s, the Szombierki Power Plant was one of the largest in the People's Republic of Poland and Europe.

In the 1970s, the power plant was converted from a thermal power station to a combined heat and power plant. It was modernised up until the mid 1990s, and from 1993 it was owned by Zespół Elektrociepłowni Bytom S.A. Since the late 1990s, the power plant has been operating at a significantly reduced capacity, used primarily as a reserve power plant. It is considered an industrial monument (a part of the Trail of Monuments of Engineering in the Silesian Voivodeship, Szlak Zabytków Techniki Województwa Śląskiego). During a 2009 vote organized by mmsilesia.pl, TVS and supported by the officials of the Silesian Voivodeship, it was voted as one of the "Seven Architectural Wonders of the Silesian Voivodeship". As of 2013 the structure has been officially classified as a monument by the government of Poland. Since the mid-1990s, it has been a host site to a number of cultural events (such as concerts or exhibitions) until 2011, when it was acquired by Finnish company Fortum and closed due to concerns over structure stability. Parts of the structure are still open for small guided tours.

There are plans to convert it into a museum or a similar type of a cultural institution.

In 2020, the power station was registered by Europa Nostra in the list of endangered cultural monuments. The building complex is currently massively threatened in its existence.
