= Old Town Hall (Szombierki) =

Former government building in Bytom, Poland

Old Town Hall in Szombierki
- Polish: Stary Ratusz w Szombierkach; Silesian: Stary Rathaus w Szōmbierkach
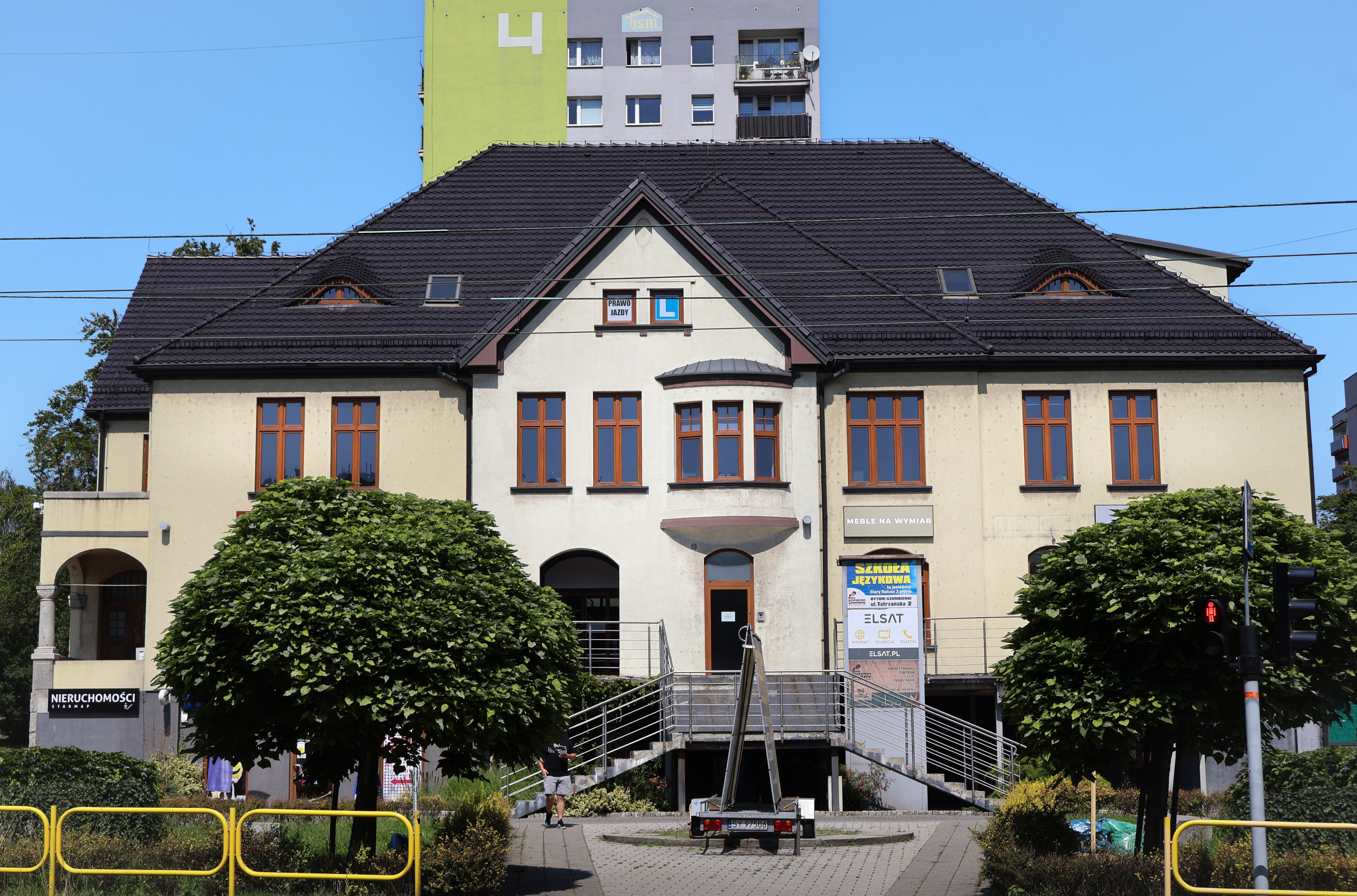
- The former town hall, August 2025
- Interactive map of the Old Town Hall in Szombierki area

General information
- Type: Town hall
- Architectural style: Modernism
- Location: Bytom (Szombierki), Poland, ul. Tatrzańska 2
- Coordinates: 50°20′17″N 18°53′30″E
- Completed: 1913
- Owner: Capital Consulting

The Old Town Hall in Szombierki (Polish: Stary Ratusz w Szombierkach) is a town hall building in Szombierki (a district of the city of Bytom), Poland. It used to be as the seat of the local government of the Schomberg Municipality (Until 1945), and later the Gmina Chruszczów (1945—1951).

== Memorial of the Casualties of the First World War ==
In front of the town hall used to be a memorial for the casualties of World War I from Szombierki (then Schomberg), a Russian mortar captured in Kaunas. The memorial was destroyed in 1945 and the pedestal during renovations in 2009.
