= Johannes Schweter =

German Nazi politician

Kreisleiter

Personal details
- Born: 28 August 1901 Schomberg, Province of Silesia, Kingdom of Prussia, German Empire
- Died: 4 December 1985 (aged 84) Gummersbach, North Rhine-Westphalia, West Germany
- Party: Nazi Party
- Occupation: Politician, activist

Johannes Schweter (28 August 1901 – 4 December 1985) was a German Nazi Party politician.

After attending elementary school, Schweter completed an apprenticeship in horticulture. He then worked as a garden assistant until 1922. From 1923, he owned his own nursery and a flower shop.

From October 1933 to October 1935, Schweter was the government Kreisdeputierter (district administrator) of the Beuthen district (today, Bytom). At the same time, he also was the Nazi Party Kreisleiter (county leader). He was also a member of the district administrative court, the district savings bank committee and Bürgermeister. From October 1935 to the summer of 1939, he was the Kreisleiter of Kreis Kreuzburg (today, Kluczbork County). At the 1936 parliamentary election, he was elected as a deputy to the Reichstag from electoral constituency 9, Oppeln. Reelected in April 1938, he retained this seat until the fall of the Nazi regime.

After the Second World War, Schweter worked as a commercial gardener in Gummersbach, where he died in 1985.

== Literature ==
- de:Joachim Lilla, Martin Döring, Andreas Schulz: Statisten in Uniform. Die Mitglieder des Reichstags 1933–1945. Ein biographisches Handbuch. Unter Einbeziehung der völkischen und nationalsozialistischen Reichstagsabgeordneten ab Mai 1924. Droste, Düsseldorf 2004, ISBN 3-7700-5254-4.
- de:Erich Stockhorst: 5000 Köpfe. Wer war was im 3. Reich. 2. Auflage. Arndt, Kiel 2000, p. 406, ISBN 3-88741-116-1.
