= Szombierki Coal Mine =

Coordinates: 50°20′18″N 18°54′39″E

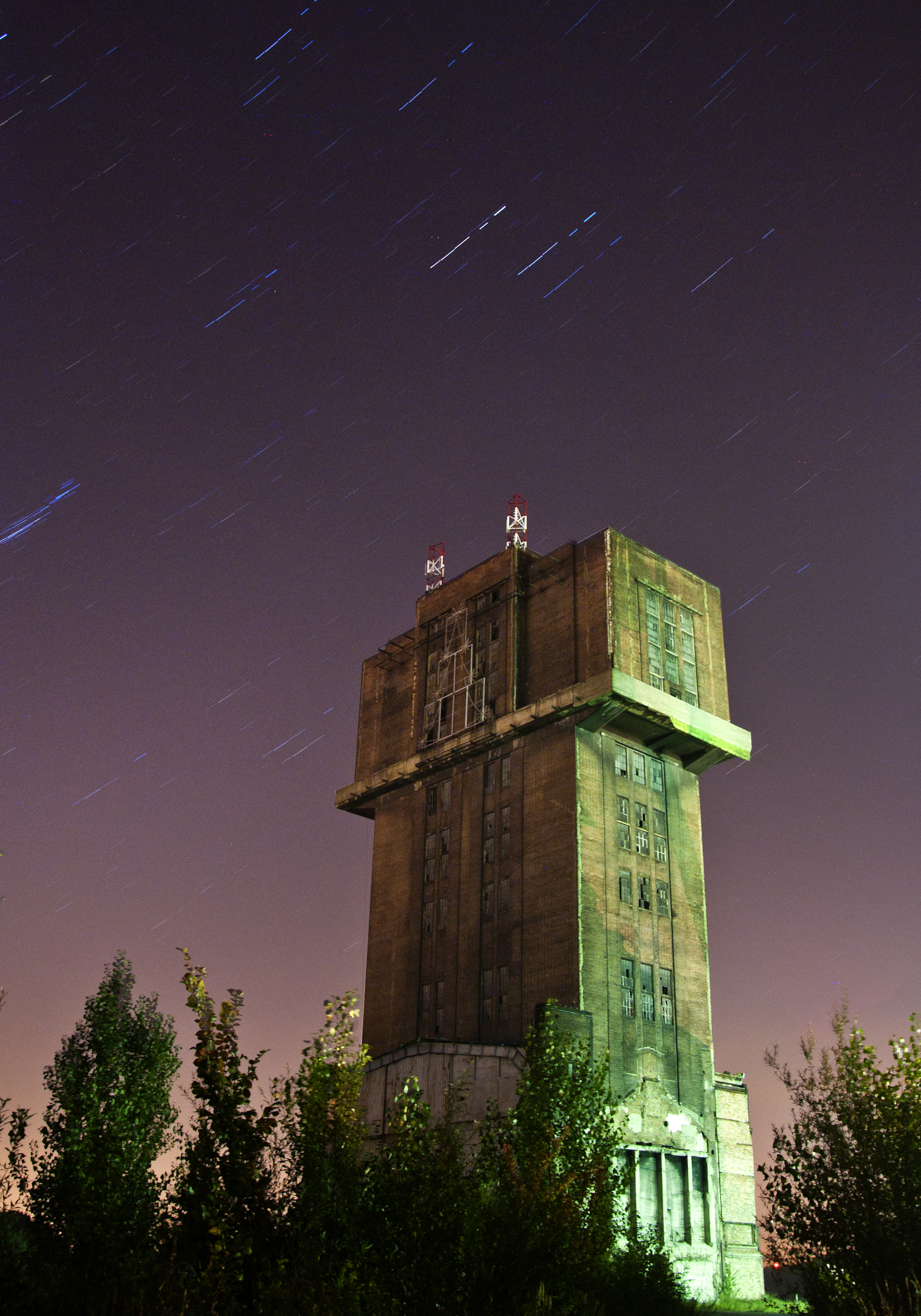
Krystyna winding tower at night

Szombierki Coal Mine is a former coal mine in Szombierki, Bytom, Poland. It was created in 1870 from several smaller coal fields. From mid-1990s it began to be closed down.

In 2004 its winding tower "Krystyna" (formerly Kaiser Wilhelm) was added to the Polish register of monuments.

During a 2009 vote the tower was voted as one of the "Seven Architectural Wonders of the Silesian Voivodeship."
