= Church of the Most Sacred Heart of Jesus in Szombierki =

- Kościół Najświętszego Serca Pana Jezusa w Szombierkach
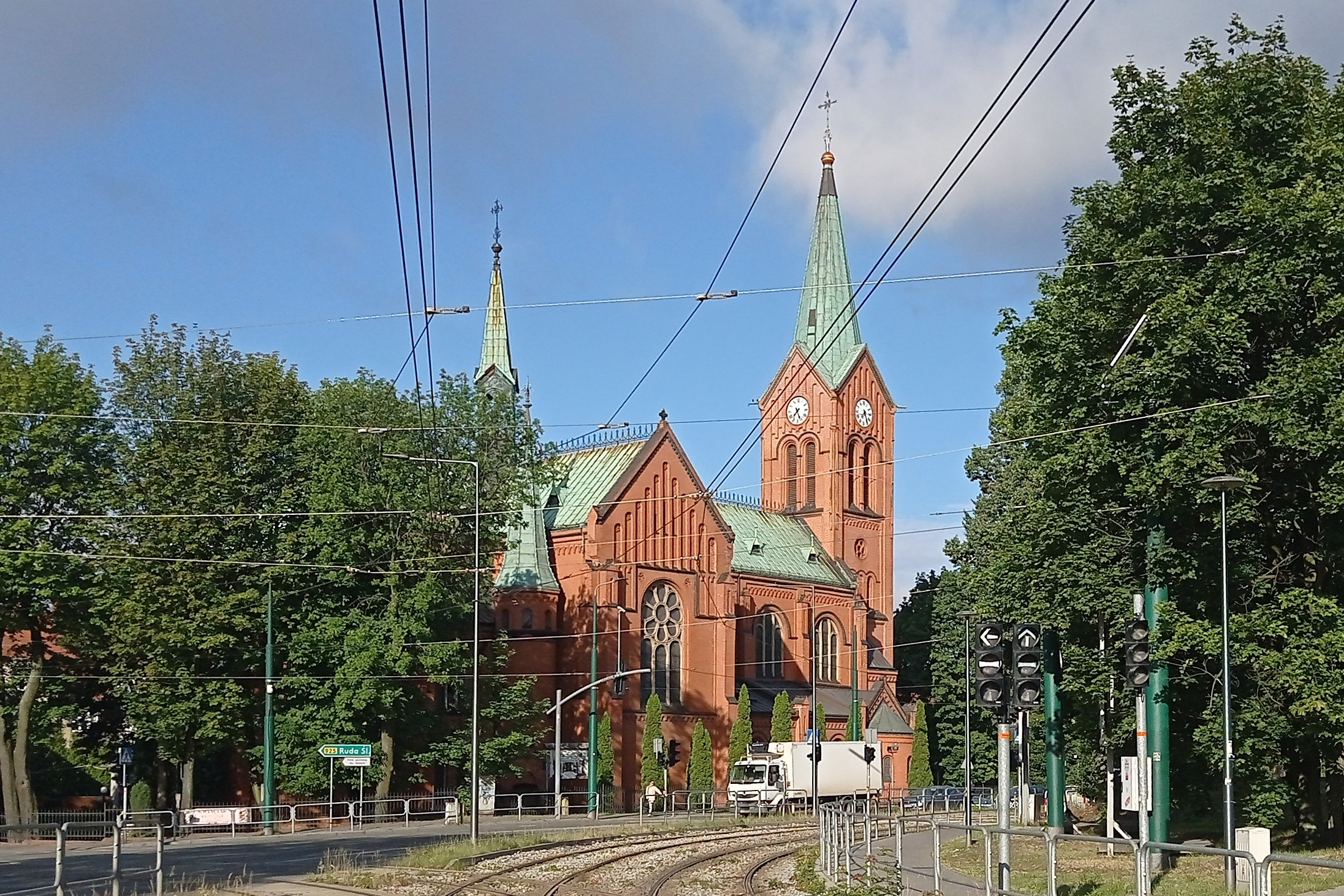
- Church of the Most Sacred Heart of Jesus in Szombierki
- Country: Poland
- Denomination: Catholic
- Website: www.nspj-szombierki.pl

History
- Status: Active
- Founded: 1902
- Consecrated: 20th of June, 1905

Architecture
- Functional status: Parish church
- Architect: Wilhelm Wieczorek
- Style: Neo-Romanesque
- Completed: 1904

Administration
- Parish: Gliwice

The Church of the Most Sacred Heart of Jesus in Szombierki (Polish: Kościół Najświętszego Serca Pana Jezusa w Szombierkach, Parafia Najświętszego Serca Pana Jezusa), commonly referred to as simply the "Church of the Most Sacred Heart of Jesus" is a church in Szombierki, a district of the city of Bytom.

== See also ==
- Chapel of the Blessed Virgin Mary and St. Joseph
