= Szombierki =

Szombierki Szōmbierki (Silesian)
- Bytom District
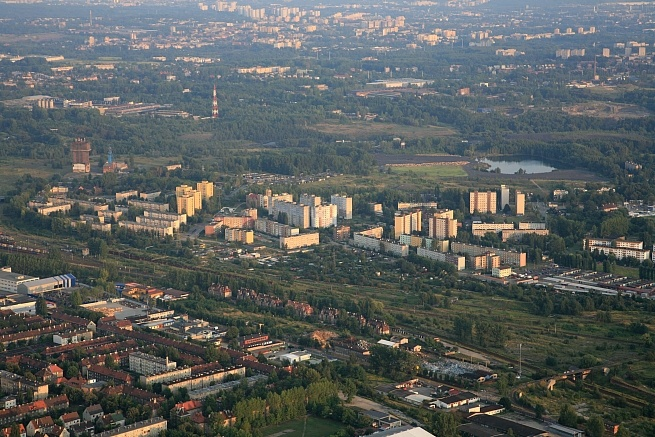
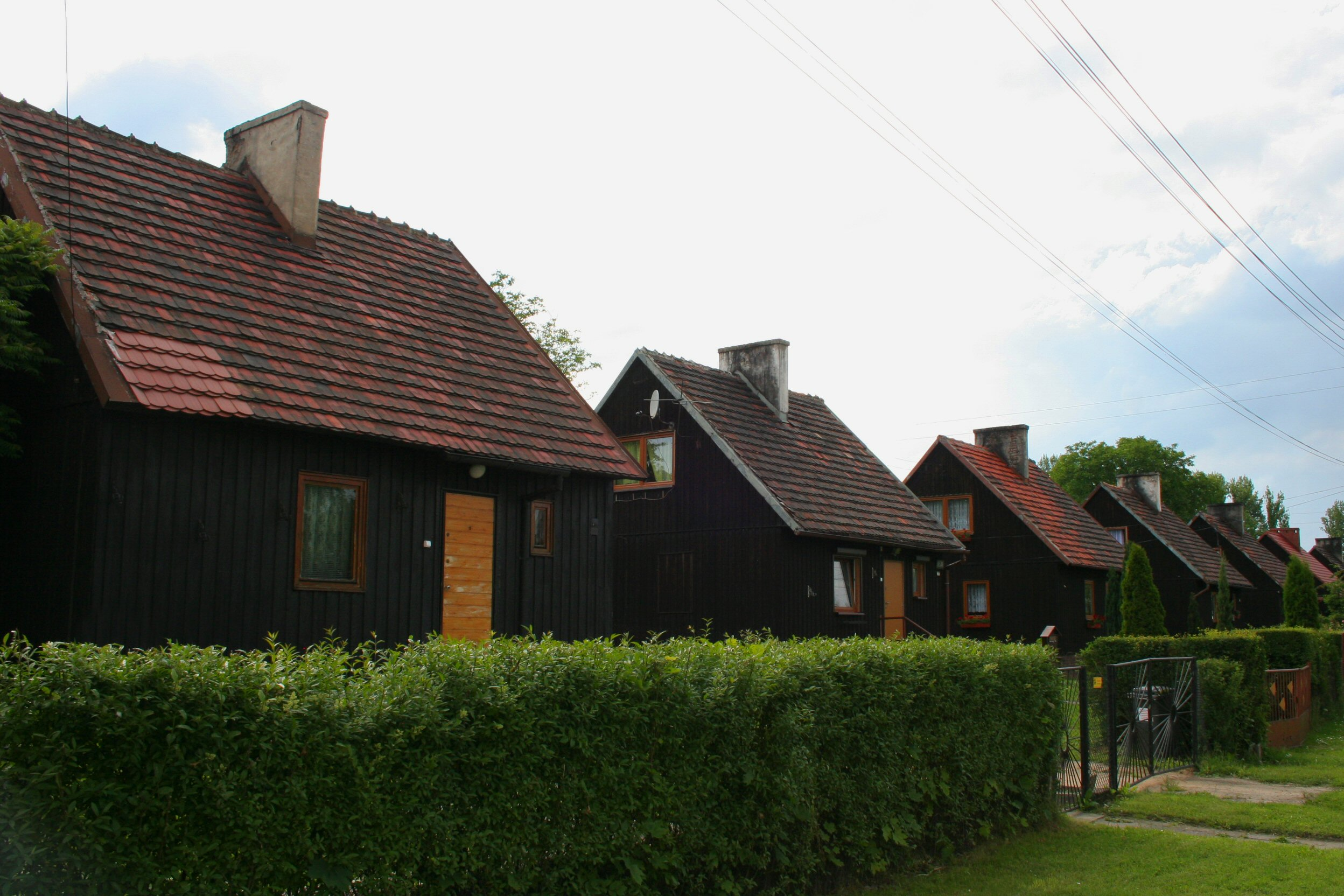
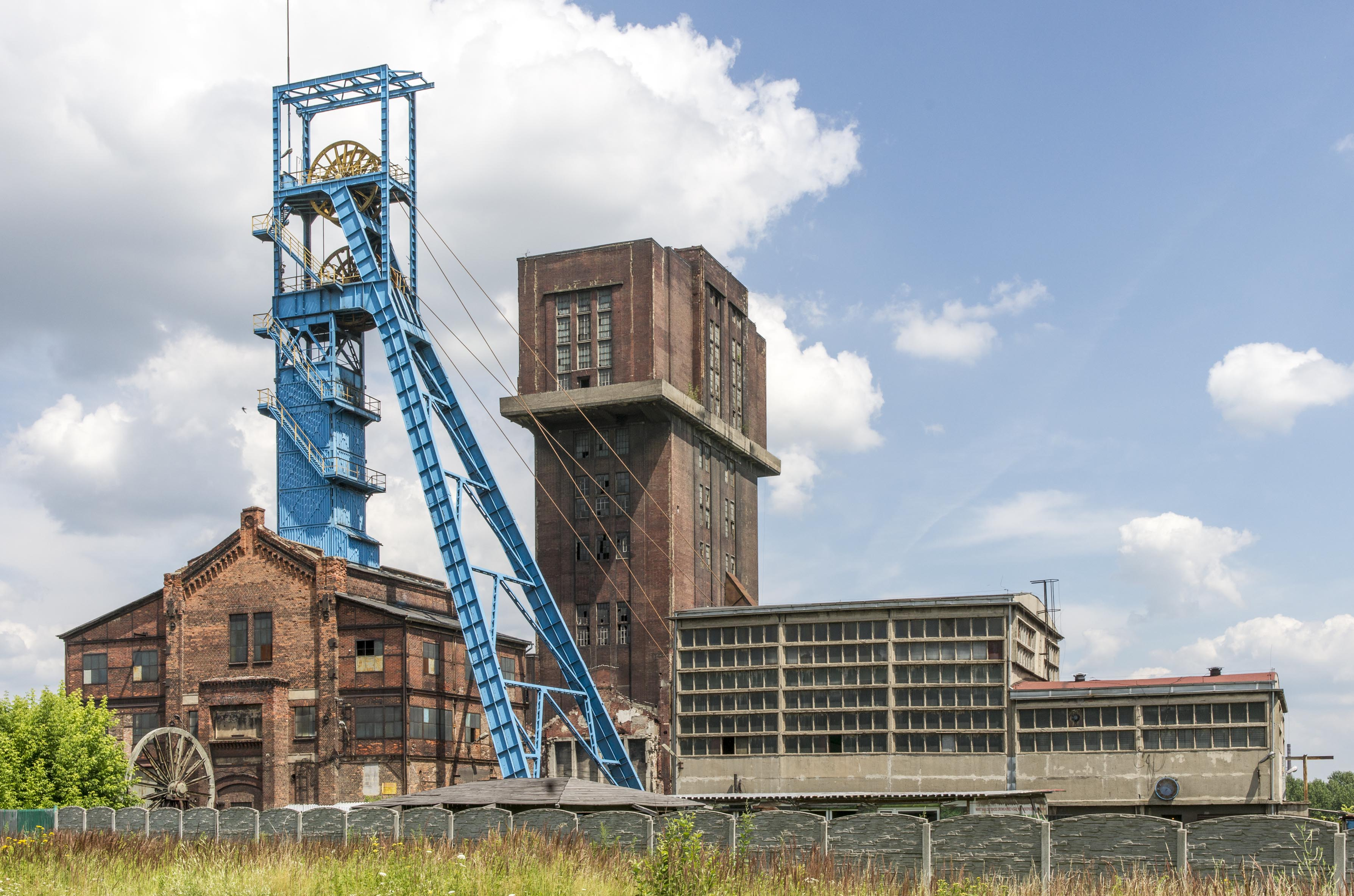
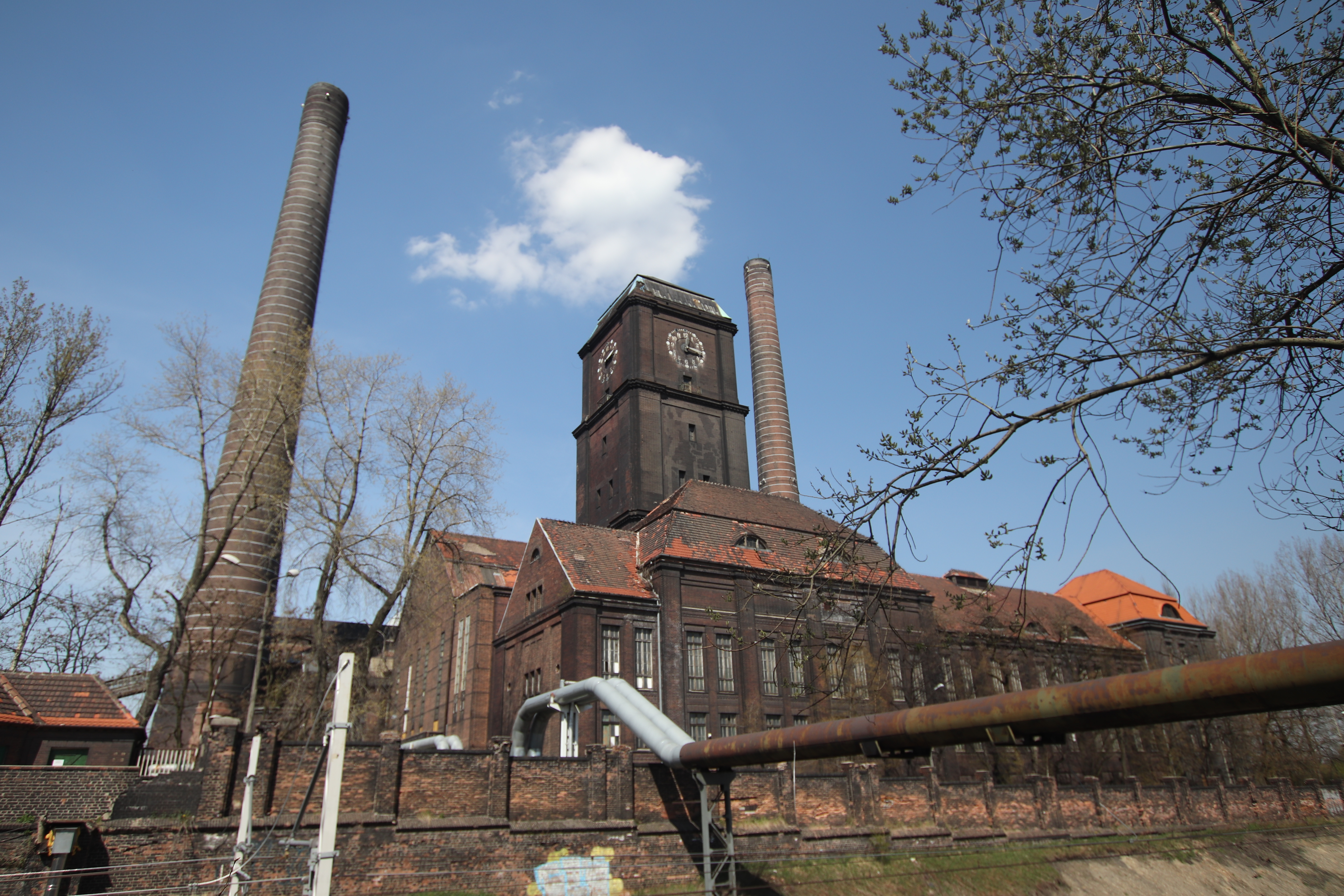
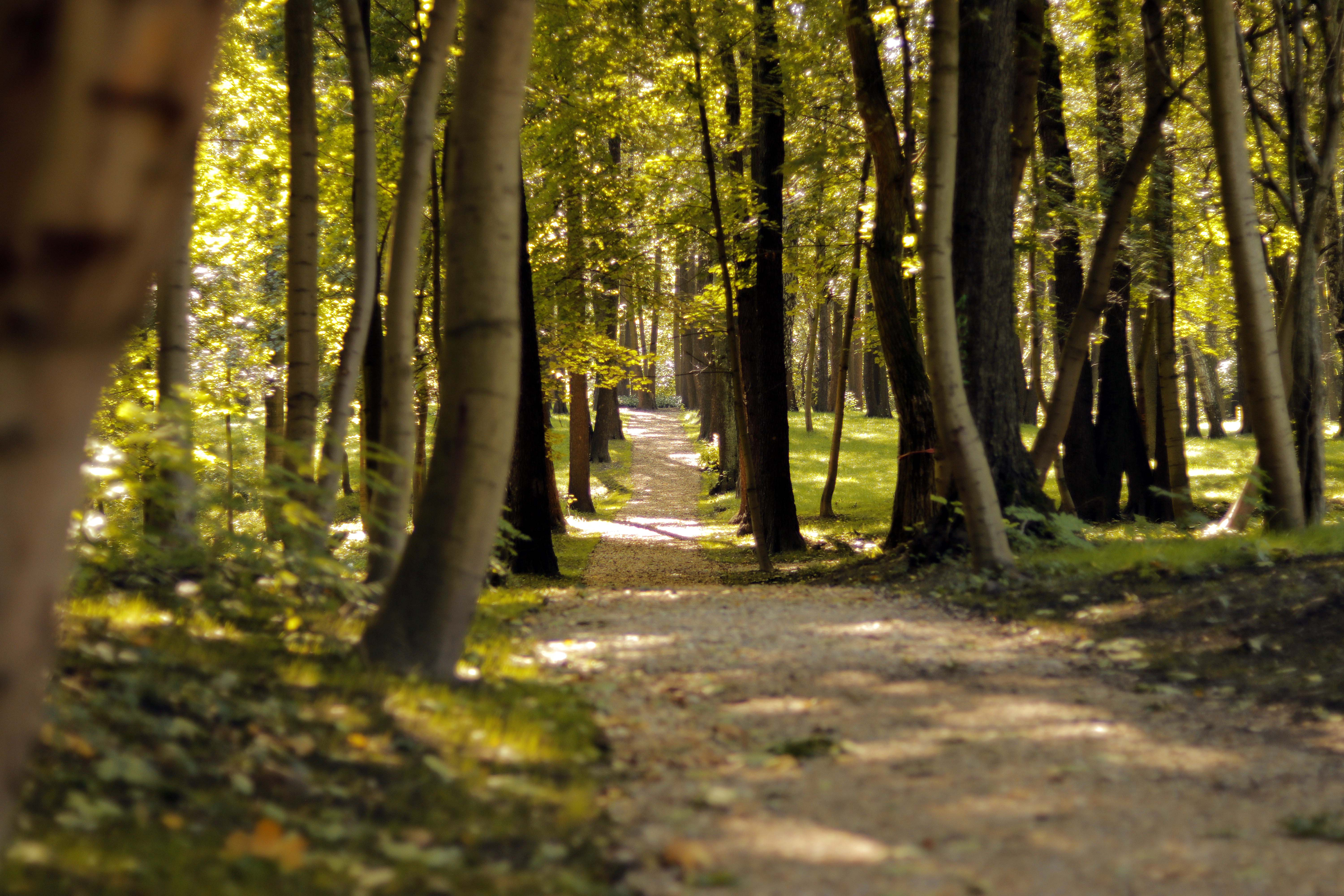
- From top, left to right: Aerial view of Szombiekri, Finnish houses in Szombierki, Former Szombierki Coal Mine, Szombierki Heat Power Station, Fazaniec Park.

- Location of Szombierki within Bytom.
- Country: Poland
- Voivodeship: Silesian
- County/City: Bytom
- First mentioned: 1369
- Within city limits: 1951
- Notable landmarks: Szombierki Heat Power Station, Szombierki Coal Mine, Szombierki town hall, Fazaniec Park.

Area
  - Total: 493 km^{2} (190 sq mi)

Population
  - Total: 23,665
  - Density: 48.0/km^{2} (124/sq mi)
- Time zone: UTC+1 (CET)
  - Summer (DST): UTC+2 (CEST)
- Postal code: 41-907
- Vehicle registration: SY

Szombierki (German: Schomberg, Silesian: Szōmbierki) is a district of Bytom, Poland, located in the southern part of the city.

Szombierki Heat Power Station and Szombierki Coal Mine (KWK Szombierki), both recognized as important historical and industrial monuments, are located here.

In 2004 the winding tower "Krystyna" of the former coal mine KWK Szombierki and its surroundings was listed as a National Heritage Site. In 2009 the tower and the Power Station were voted as two of the "Seven Architectural Wonders of the Silesian Voivodeship." In 2013 the Power Station was also recognized as a national heritage site.

The village of Szombierki was first mentioned in documents in 1369. In 1768, the first coal mine was established in Szombierki. However, it was closed around 1820. During World War II, Nazi Germany held prisoners of war in the settlement. POWs worked as forced labourers in the local coal mine, which formed the E72 subcamp of the Stalag VIII-B/344 prisoner of war camp.

Szombierki is home to football club Szombierki Bytom, established in 1919, Polish champions from 1980.

The historic churches of Saint Margaret and of the Sacred Heart of Jesus are located in the district.

== Etymology and other names ==
=== Etymology ===
The origin of the district's name is disputed, some suggest it derived from the name of Fridericus de Schonenburch, a knight who was a witness of the vassalage of Casimir II to the king of Bohemia, while others point towards "Schönberg" (Meaning Beautiful Mountain in German), a medieval settlement located in the approximate area of Szombierki.

=== Name of the district in various languages ===
| Language | Name/s |
|---|---|
| Polish | Szombierki |
| (Polish) Silesian | Szōmbierki (Ślabikŏrzowy szrajbōnek), Szůmbierki (Steuer alphabet) |
| German | Schomberg |
| (German) Silesian | Schumbarg |

=== Former names ===
Shortly after the Polish communist authorities took over Szombierki, its name was officially changed to "Chruszczów". The origin of the name is unknown and it was changed back in 1985.

== Religion ==
At the turn of the 20th and 19th centuries Szombierki had a population of roughly 3,000 people and the village was subordinate to the Holy Trinity church in Bytom. It was decided that a church was to be built in Szombierki and the construction began in 1902. It was designed by Wilhelm Wieczorek and funded by the Schaffgotsch. In 1904 the Church of the Most Sacred Heart of Jesus in Szombierki was completed and it was consecrated on 20 June 1905.

=== List of churches in Szombierki ===
| Name | Image | Denomination | Location | Construction Began | Construction Finished | Patronage |
|---|---|---|---|---|---|---|
| Church of Saint Margaret of Antioch | | Catholic | 50°20′27″N 18°54′53″E | - | 1881 | Margaret of Antioch |
| Church of the Most Sacred Heart of Jesus | | Catholic | 50°20′05″N 18°53′44″E | 1902 | 1904 | Most Sacred Heart of Jesus |
| Church of the Ascension | | Catholic | 50°20′23″N 18°54′15″E | 1985 | 2001 | Ascension of Jesus |

== Notable people ==
- Johannes Schweter (born 1901), German NSDAP politician
- Carl-Heinz Stephan (1904-1989), German mining manager
- Wiktor Maks, Pole, President and co-founder of TS Poniatowski (now Szombierki Bytom)

== Gallery ==
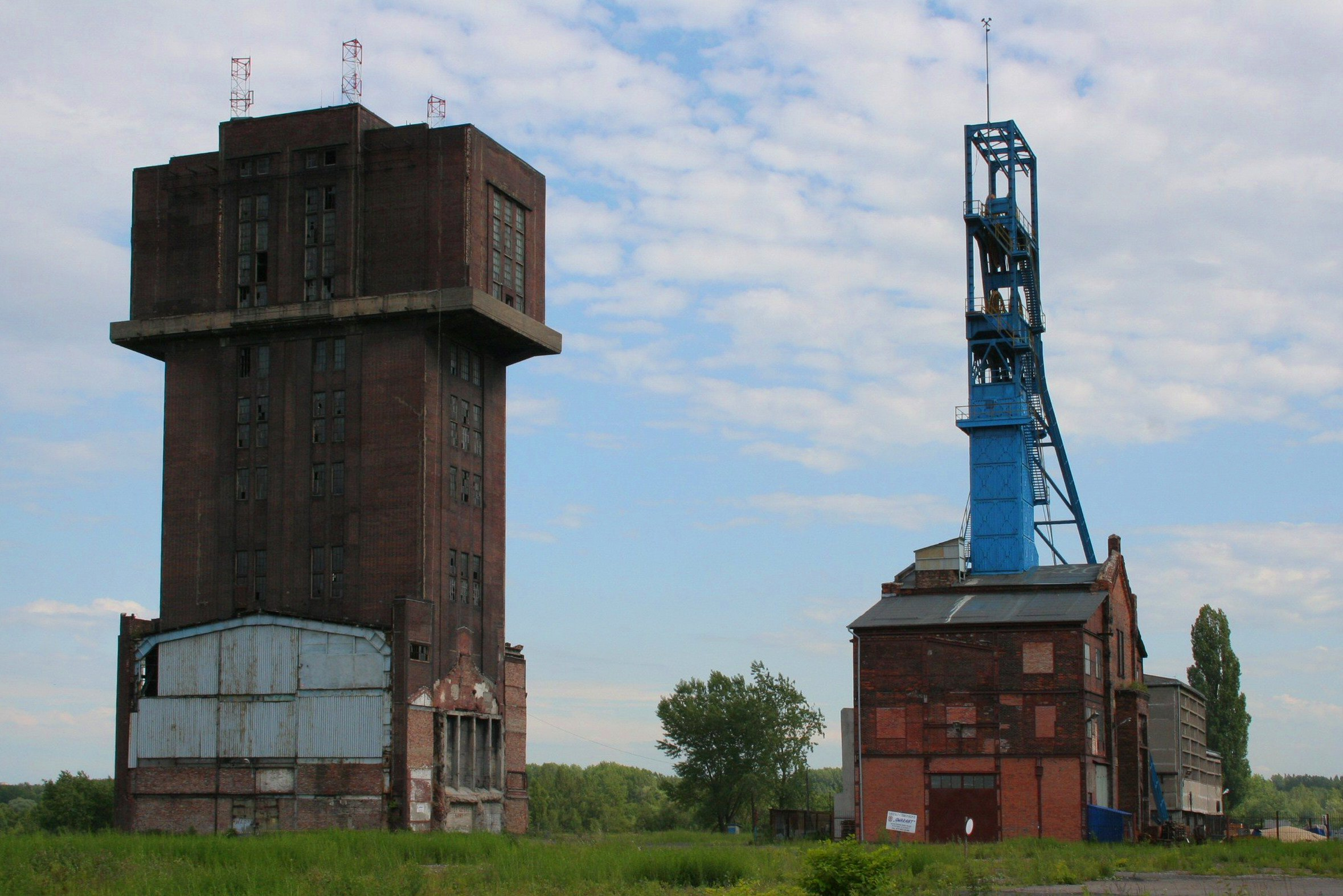
Winding towers Krystyna (right) and Ewa

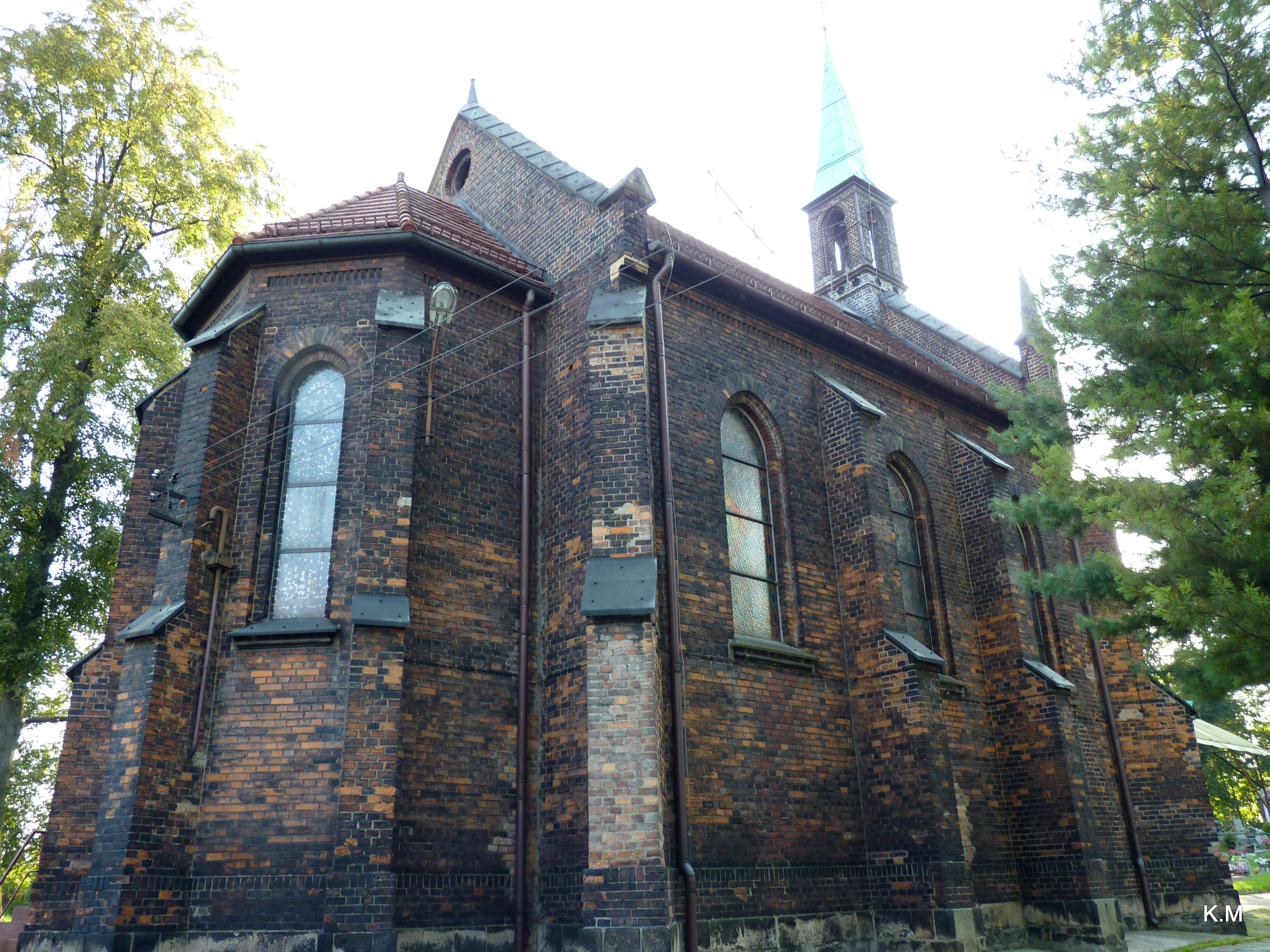
Saint Margaret Church

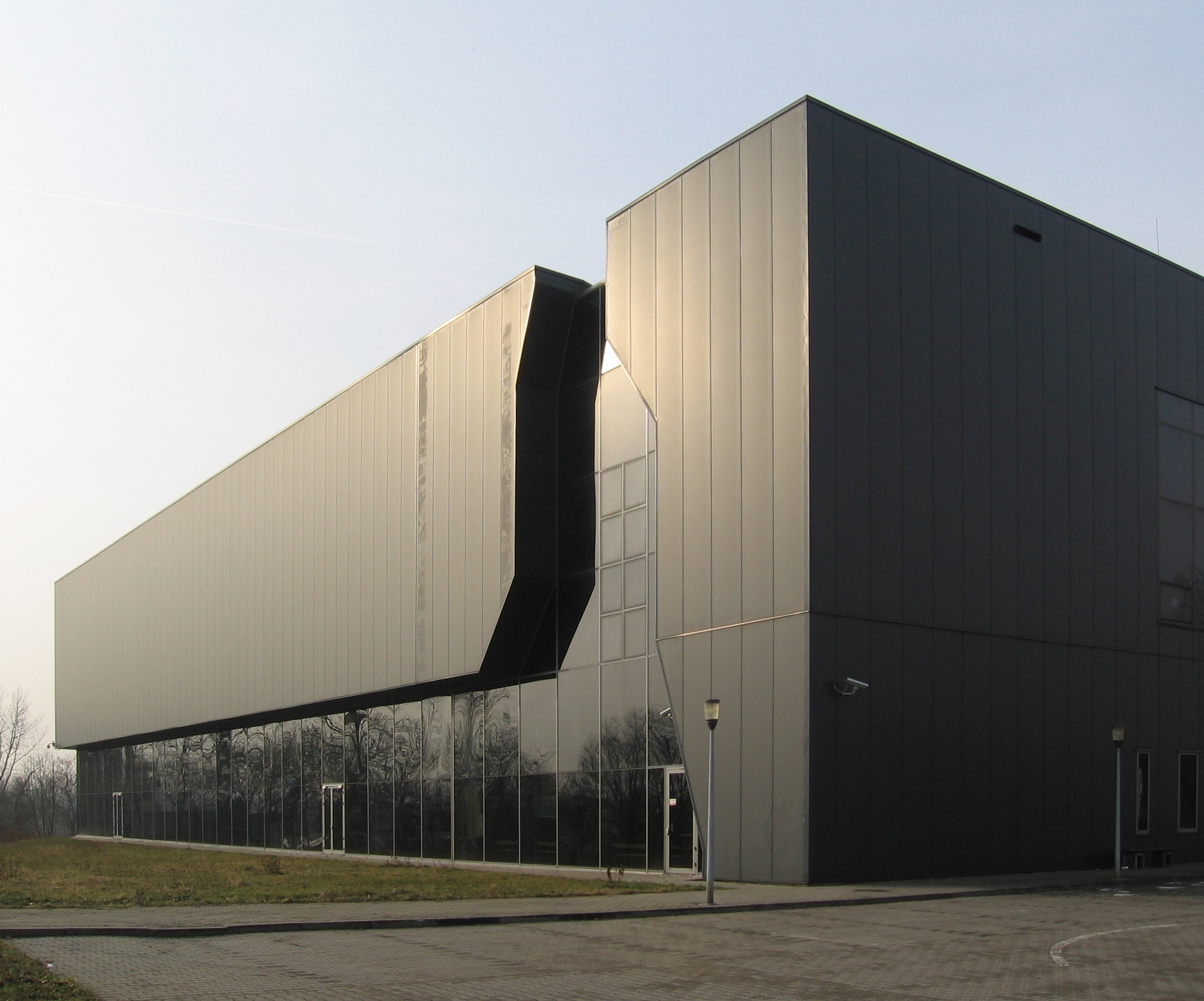
City Sports Hall (Miejska Hala Sportowa)

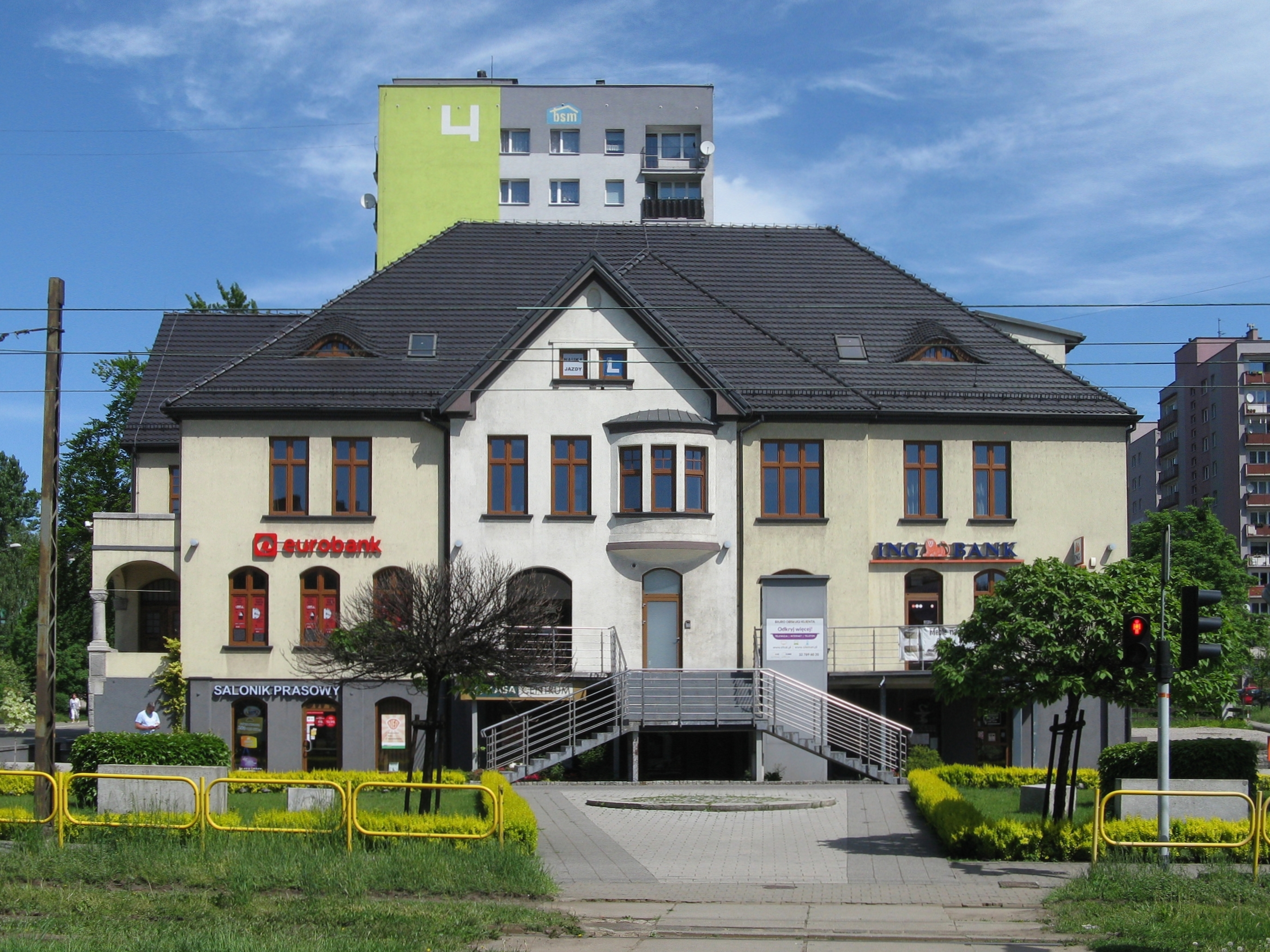
Former Szombierki town hall
